= 1970s =

Decade of the Gregorian calendar

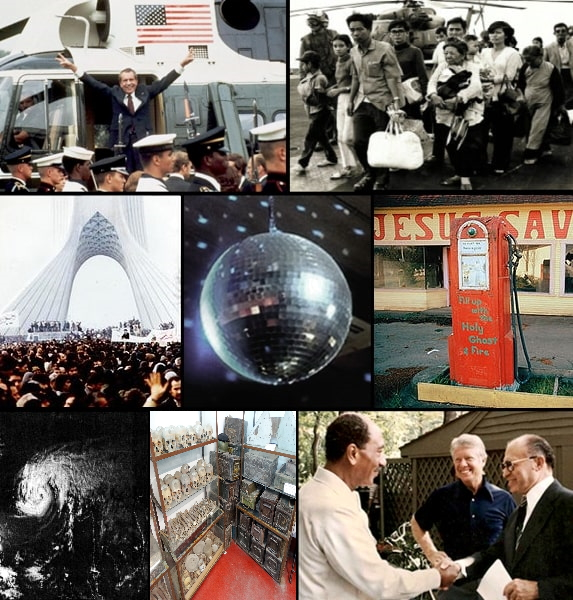
Clockwise from top-left: U.S. President Richard Nixon doing the V for Victory sign after his resignation from office following the Watergate scandal in 1974; The United States was still involved in the Vietnam War in the early decade. The New York Times leaked information regarding the nation's involvement in the war. Political pressure led to America's withdrawal from the war in 1973, and the Fall of Saigon in 1975 leading to evacuations of South Vietnamese that same year; The 1973 oil crisis causes a financial crisis throughout the developed world; Both the leaders of Israel and Egypt shake hands after the signing of the Camp David Accords in 1978; In 1971, the Pakistan Armed Forces commits the 1971 Bangladesh genocide to curb independence movements in East Pakistan, killing 300,000 to 3,000,000 people; this consequently leads to the Bangladesh Liberation War; The 1970 Bhola cyclone kills an estimated 500,000 people in the densely populated Ganges Delta region of East Pakistan in November 1970, and became the deadliest natural disaster in 40 years; The Iranian Revolution of 1979 ousts Mohammad Reza Pahlavi who is later replaced by an Islamic theocracy led by Ayatollah Khomeini; The popularity of the disco music genre and subculture peaks during the mid-to-late 1970s.

The 1970s (pronounced "nineteen-seventies"; commonly shortened to the "Seventies" or the "'70s") was the decade that began on January 1, 1970, and ended on December 31, 1979. It is generally regarded by historians as a transitional period between the postwar order and the more globalized, market-oriented world that emerged in the late 20th century. The decade was marked by major economic and geopolitical disruptions, including the breakdown of elements of the postwar economic system, oil shocks, stagflation, political realignments, and the continuing decline of European colonial empires, alongside significant advances in civil rights, feminism, environmentalism, human rights, and technology. At the same time, the Cold War remained the dominant framework of international politics, although the decade witnessed important shifts in the balance of power and the growth of transnational issues such as globalization, environmental protection, and population growth.

In the 21st century, historians have increasingly portrayed the 1970s as a "pivot of change" in world history, focusing especially on the economic upheavals that followed the end of the postwar economic boom. On a global scale, it was characterized by frequent coups, domestic conflicts and civil wars, and various political upheavals and armed conflicts which arose from or were related to decolonization, and the global struggle between NATO, the Warsaw Pact, and the Non-Aligned Movement. Many regions had periods of high-intensity conflict, notably Southeast Asia, the Middle East, Latin America, and Africa.

In the Western world, social progressive values that began in the 1960s, such as increasing political awareness and economic liberty of women, continued to grow. In the United Kingdom, the 1979 election resulted in the victory of its Conservative leader Margaret Thatcher, the first female British prime minister. Industrialized countries experienced an economic recession due to an oil crisis caused by oil embargoes by the Organization of Arab Petroleum Exporting Countries. The crisis saw the first instance of stagflation which began a political and economic trend of the replacement of Keynesian economic theory with neoliberal economic theory, with the first neoliberal government coming to power with the 1973 Chilean coup d'état.

The 1970s was also an era of great technological and scientific advances; since the appearance of the first commercial microprocessor, the Intel 4004 in 1971, the decade was characterised by a profound transformation of computing units – by then rudimentary, spacious machines – into the realm of portability and home accessibility. There were also great advances in fields such as physics, which saw the consolidation of quantum field theory at the end of the decade, mainly thanks to the confirmation of the existence of quarks and the detection of the first gauge bosons in addition to the photon, the Z boson and the gluon, part of what was christened in 1975 as the Standard Model.

In Asia, the People's Republic of China's international relations changed significantly following its recognition by the United Nations, the death of Mao Zedong and the beginning of market liberalization by Mao's successors. Despite facing an oil crisis due to the OPEC embargo, the economy of Japan witnessed a large boom in this period, overtaking the economy of West Germany to become the second-largest in the world. The United States withdrew its military forces from the Vietnam War. In 1979, the Soviet Union invaded Afghanistan, which led to the Soviet–Afghan War.

The 1970s saw an initial increase in violence in the Middle East as Egypt and Syria declared war on Israel, starting the Yom Kippur War, but in the late 1970s, the situation was fundamentally altered when Egypt signed the Egyptian–Israeli Peace Treaty. Political tensions in Iran exploded with the Iranian Revolution in 1979, which overthrew the Pahlavi dynasty and established an Islamic republic under the leadership of Ayatollah Khomeini.

Africa saw further decolonization in the decade, with Angola and Mozambique gaining their independence in 1975 from the Portuguese Empire after the Carnation Revolution in Portugal. Furthermore, Spain withdrew its claim over Spanish Sahara in 1976, marking the formal end of the Spanish Empire. The continent was, however, plagued by endemic military coups, with the long-reigning Emperor of Ethiopia Haile Selassie being removed, civil wars and famine.

The economies of much of the developing world continued to make steady progress in the early 1970s because of the Green Revolution. However, their economic growth was slowed by the oil crisis, although it boomed afterwards.

The 1970s saw the world population increase from 3.7 to 4.4 billion, with approximately 1.23 billion births and 475 million deaths occurring during the decade.

== Politics and wars ==
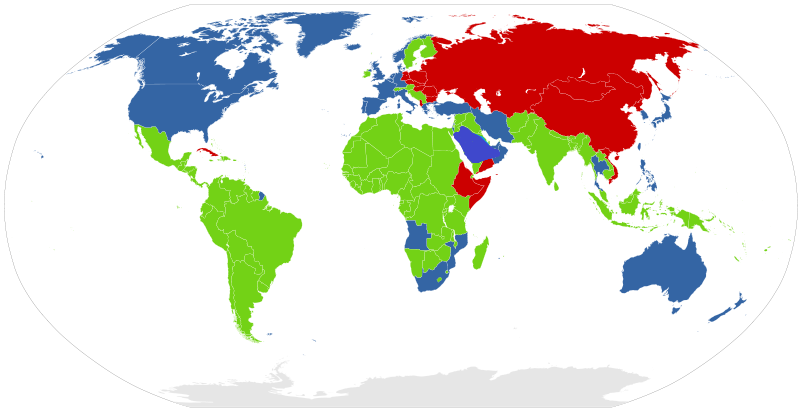
The world map of military alliances in 1970s: Western allies (blue), Non-aligned countries (green) and Soviet allies (red)

=== Wars ===
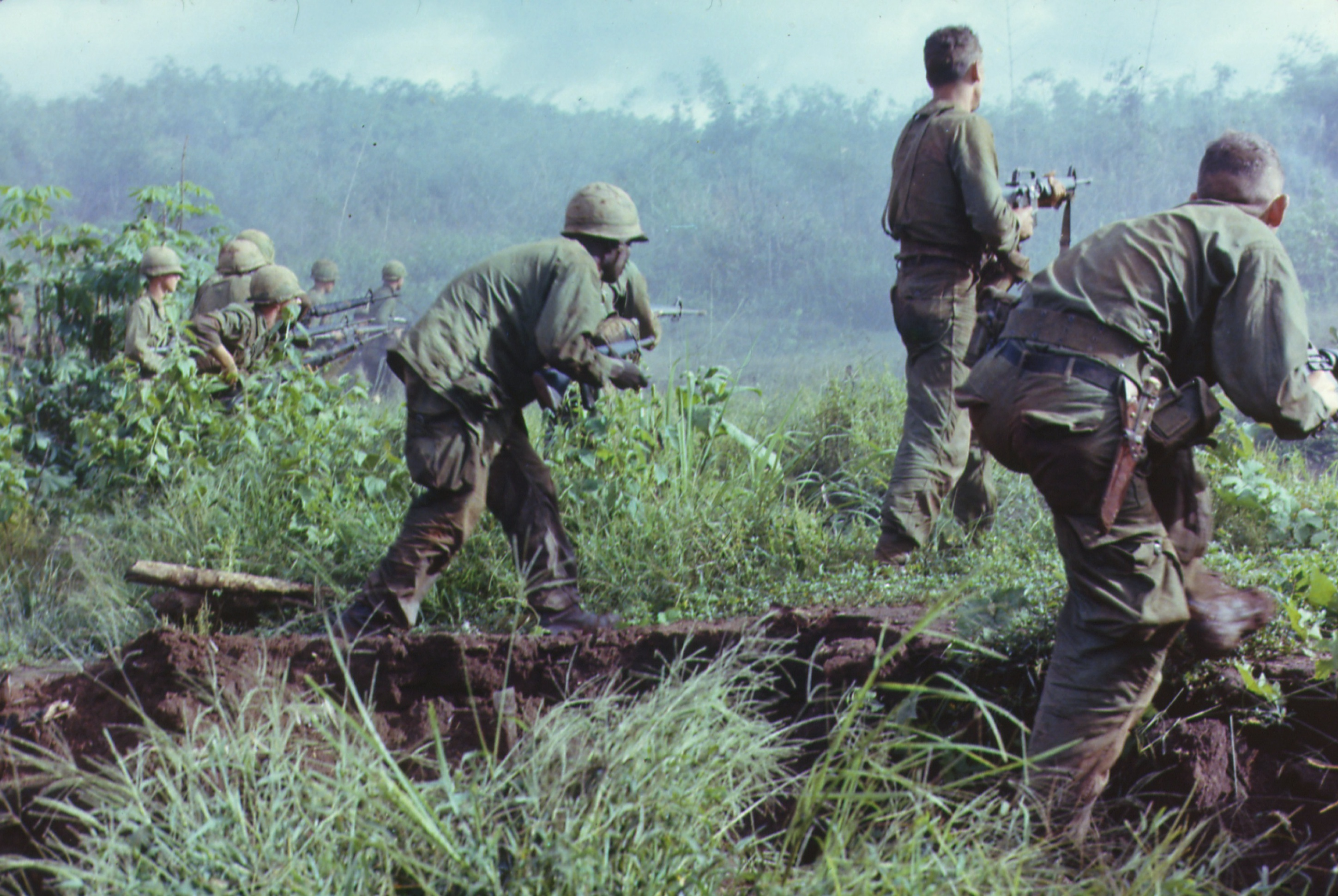
The Vietnam War (1955–1975)

The most notable wars and/or other conflicts of the decade include:

- The Cold War (1945–1991)
  - The Vietnam War came to a close in 1975 with the Fall of Saigon and the unconditional surrender of South Vietnam on April 30, 1975. The south temporarily became a Provisional Revolutionary and a satellite state of the north. The following year, on July 2, 1976, Vietnam was officially declared reunited and the South Vietnamese Provisional Government was dissolved. In the next following year, on February 4, 1977, the Viet Cong was disbanded, and its former members became a part of the Vietnam People's Army.
  - Soviet–Afghan War (1979–1989) – Although taking place almost entirely throughout the 1980s, the war officially started on December 27, 1979.
  - Angolan Civil War (1975–2002) – resulting in intervention by multiple countries on the Marxist and anti-Marxist sides, with Cuba and Mozambique supporting the Marxist faction, and South Africa and Zaire supporting the anti-Marxists.
  - Cambodian Civil War (1967–1975) ends with the Khmer Rouge establishing Democratic Kampuchea.
  - Ethiopian Civil War (1974–1991)
  - The Bangladesh Liberation War of 1971 in South Asia, engaging East Pakistan, West Pakistan, and India
  - Cambodian–Vietnamese War (1978–1991)

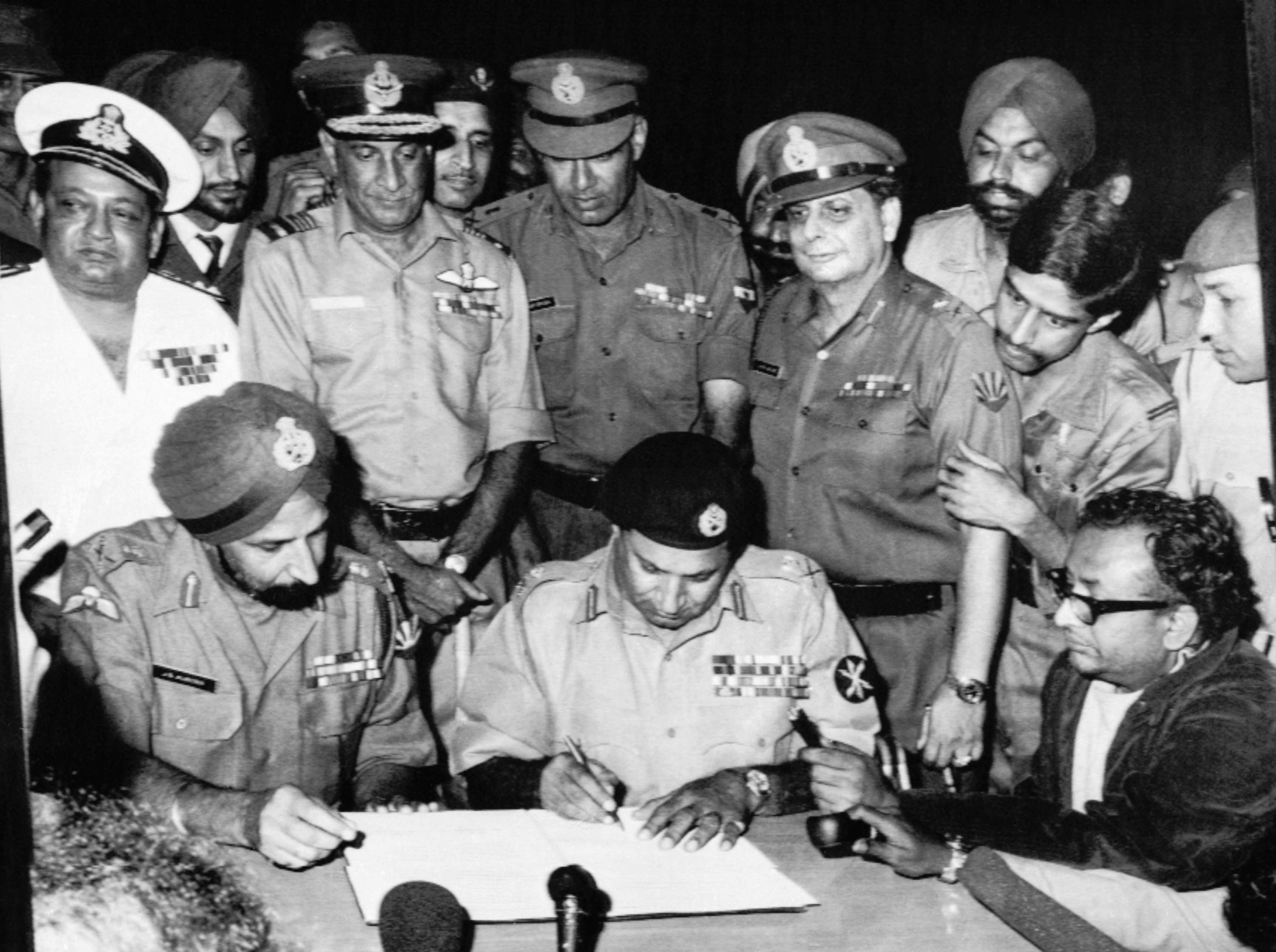
Pakistan Army General A. A. K. Niazi signing surrender agreement before Sh. Jagjit Singh Aurora of Indian Army after getting defeated in the 1971 Bangladesh Liberation War against East Pakistan, which eventually liberated as Bangladesh later.

- The Portuguese Colonial War (1961–1974)
- 1971 Bangladesh genocide
- Indo-Pakistani War of 1971
- Arab–Israeli conflict (Early 20th century–present)

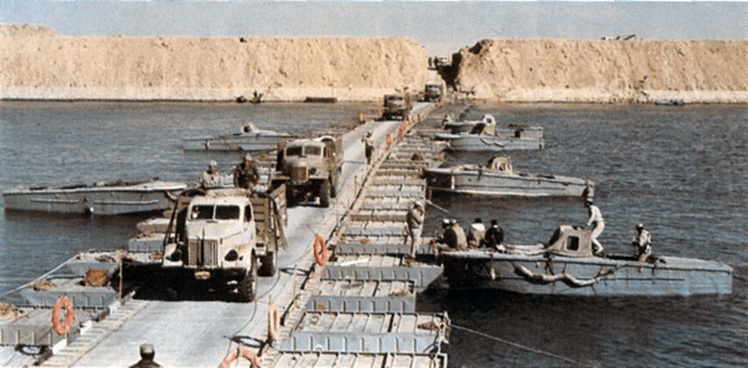
Egyptian military vehicles crossing the Suez Canal on October 7, 1973, during the Yom Kippur War.

  - Yom Kippur War (1973) – the war was launched by Egypt and Syria against Israel in October 1973 to recover territories lost by the Arabs in the 1967 conflict. The Israelis were taken by surprise and suffered heavy losses before they rallied. In the end, they managed to repel the Egyptians (and a simultaneous attack by Syria in the Golan Heights) and crossed the Suez Canal into Egypt proper. In 1978, Egypt signed a peace treaty with Israel at Camp David in the United States, ending outstanding disputes between the two countries. Sadat's actions would lead to his assassination in 1981.
- Turkish invasion of Cyprus (1974)
- Indonesian invasion of East Timor (1975)
- Indian emergency (1975–1977)
- Lebanese Civil War (1975–1990) – A civil war in the Middle East which at times also involved the PLO and Israel during the early 1980s.
- Western Sahara War (1975–1991) – A regional war pinning the rebel Polisario Front against Morocco and Mauritania.
- Ugandan–Tanzanian War (1978–1979) – the war which was fought between Uganda and Tanzania was based on an expansionist agenda to annex territory from Tanzania. The war resulted in the overthrow of Idi Amin's regime.
- The Ogaden War (1977–1978) was another African conflict between Somalia and Ethiopia over control of the Ogaden region.
- The Rhodesian Bush War (1964–1979)
- The South African Border War (1966–1990)

=== International conflicts ===
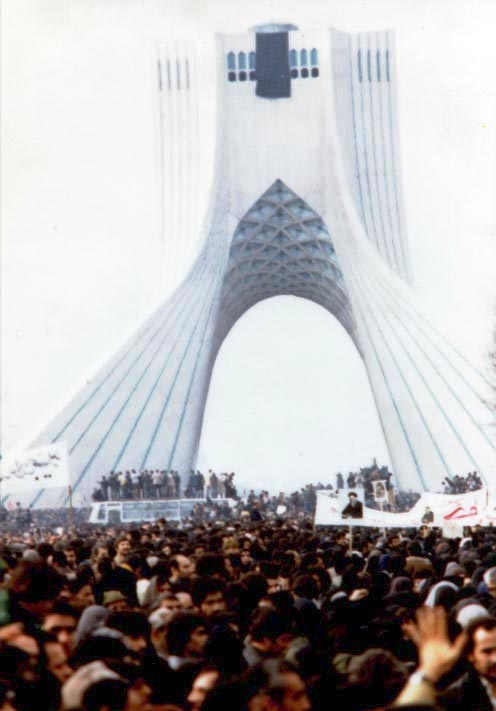
1979 Iranian Revolution

The most notable International conflicts of the decade include:

- Major conflict between capitalist and communist forces in multiple countries, while attempts are made by the Soviet Union and the United States to lessen the chance for conflict, such as both countries endorsing nuclear nonproliferation.
- In June 1976, peaceful student protests in the Soweto township of South Africa by black students against the use of Afrikaans in schools led to the Soweto uprising which killed more than 176 people, overwhelmingly by South Africa's Security Police.
- Rise of separatism in the province of Quebec in Canada. In 1970, radical Quebec nationalist and Marxist militants of the Front de libération du Québec (FLQ) kidnapped the Quebec labour minister Pierre Laporte and British Trade Commissioner James Cross during the October Crisis, resulting in Laporte being killed, and the enactment of martial law in Canada under the War Measures Act, resulting in a campaign by the Canadian government which arrests suspected FLQ supporters. The election of the Parti Québécois led by René Lévesque in the province of Quebec in Canada, brings the first political party committed to Quebec independence into power in Quebec. Lévesque's government pursues an agenda to secede Quebec from Canada by democratic means and strengthen Francophone Québécois culture in the late 1970s, such as the controversial Charter of the French Language more commonly known in Quebec and Canada as "Bill 101".
- Martial law was declared in the Philippines on September 21, 1972, by dictator Ferdinand Marcos.
- Cambodian genocide: In Cambodia, the communist leader Pol Pot led a revolution against the American-backed government of Lon Nol. On April 17, 1975, Pot's forces captured Phnom Penh, the capital, two years after America had halted the bombings of their positions. His communist government, the Khmer Rouge, forced people out of the cities to clear jungles and establish a radical, Marxist agrarian society. Buddhist priests and monks, along with anyone who spoke foreign languages, had any sort of education, or even wore glasses were tortured or killed. As many as 3 million people may have died. The Khmer Rouge, after taking power, began to purge its ranks of Vietnamese-trained personnel and initiated incursions into Vietnam starting in April 1975. Vietnam endured repeated radical attacks by the Khmer Rouge from 1975 to 1977 and witnessed the brutal killing of numerous civilians. The Khmer Rouge leaders even overtly expressed their wish to annex Vietnam. In response, Vietnam defended its territory and attempted to negotiate with the Khmer Rouge. However, the Khmer Rouge rejected all diplomatic efforts from Vietnam and escalated hostilities, including the Ba Chúc massacre in May 1978, followed by a large-scale attack on Vietnam's territory on December 23, 1978. Vietnam launched a counteroffensive and entered Cambodia Vietnamese invasion of Cambodia, overthrowing the Khmer Rouge and supporting the government of People's Republic of Kampuchea People's Republic of Kampuchea. This provoked a brief, but furious border war with China in February of that year.
- The Iranian Revolution of 1979 transformed Iran from an autocratic pro-Western monarchy under Shah Mohammad Reza Pahlavi to a theocratic Islamist government under the leadership of Ayatollah Ruhollah Khomeini. Distrust between the revolutionaries and Western powers led to the Iran hostage crisis on November 4, 1979, where 66 diplomats, mainly from the United States, were held captive for 444 days.
- Growing internal tensions take place in Yugoslavia beginning with the Croatian Spring movement in 1971 which demands greater decentralization of power to the constituent republics of Yugoslavia. Yugoslavia's communist ruler Joseph Broz Tito subdues the Croatian Spring movement and arrests its leaders, but does initiate major constitutional reform resulting in the 1974 Constitution which decentralized powers to the republics, gave them the official right to separate from Yugoslavia, and weakened the influence of Serbia (Yugoslavia's largest and most populous constituent republic) in the federation by granting significant powers to the Serbian autonomous provinces of Kosovo and Vojvodina. In addition, the 1974 Constitution consolidated Tito's dictatorship by proclaiming him president-for-life. The 1974 Constitution would become resented by Serbs and began a gradual escalation of ethnic tensions.

=== Coups ===
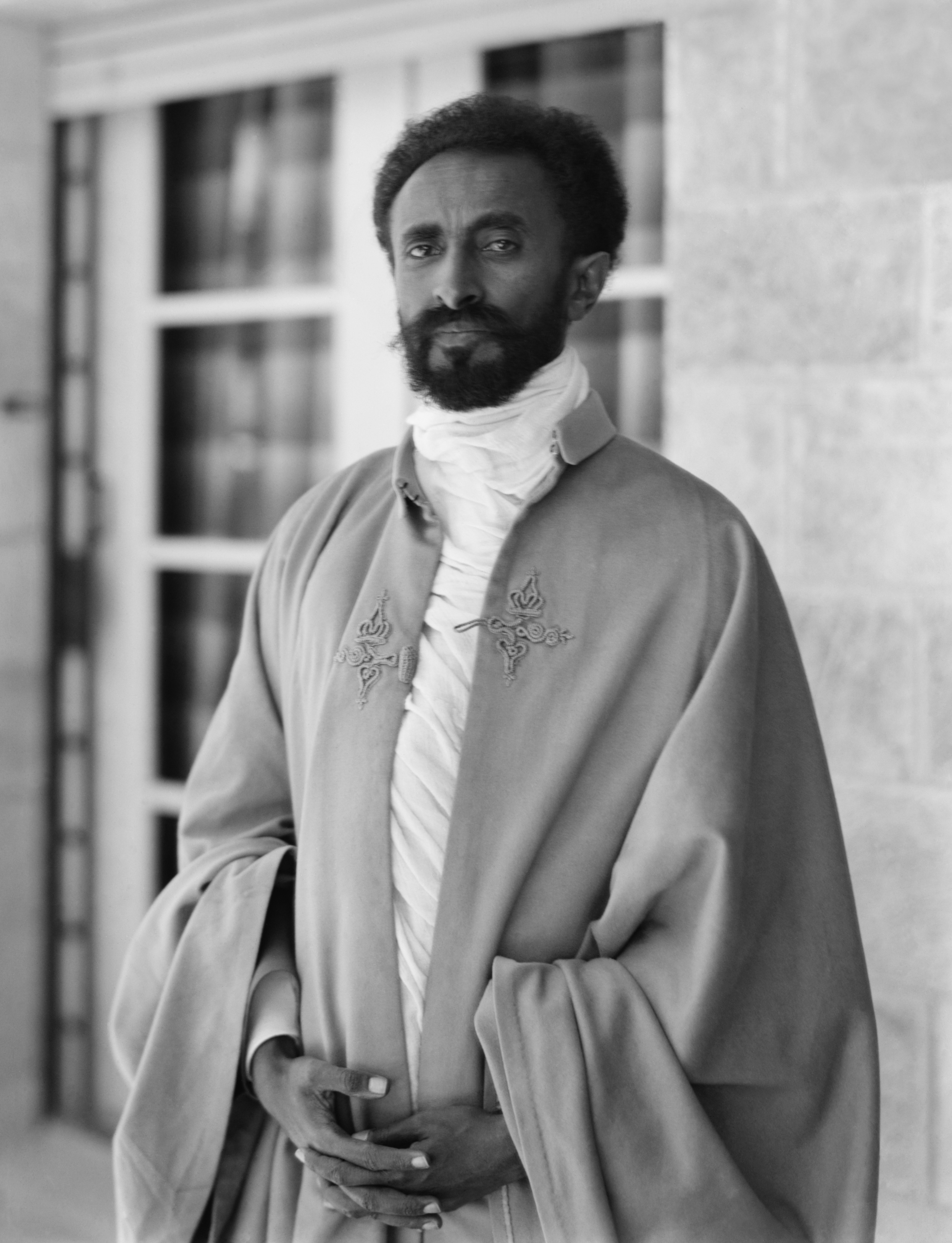
Haile Selassie was overthrown from power in Ethiopia, ending one of the longest-lasting monarchies in world history.

The most prominent coups d'état of the decade include:

- 1970 – Coup in Syria, led by Hafez al-Assad.
- 1971 – Military coup in Uganda led by Idi Amin.
- 1973 – Coup d'état in Chile on September 11th, Salvador Allende was overthrown and killed in a military attack on the presidential palace. Augusto Pinochet takes power backed by the military junta.
- 1974 – Military coup in Ethiopia led to the overthrowing of Haile Selassie by the communist junta led by General Aman Andom and Mengistu Haile Mariam, ending one of the world's longest-lasting monarchies in history.
- 1974 – (25 April) Carnation Revolution in Portugal started as a military coup organized by the Armed Forces Movement (Portuguese: Movimento das Forças Armadas, MFA) composed of military officers who opposed the Portuguese fascist regime, but the movement was soon coupled with an unanticipated and popular campaign of civil support. It would ultimately lead to the decolonization of all its colonies, but leave power vacuums that led to civil war in newly independent Lusophone African nations.
- 1975 – Sheikh Mujibur Rahman, President of Bangladesh, and almost his entire family was assassinated in the early hours of August 15, 1975, when a group of Bangladesh Army personnel went to his residence and killed him, during a coup d'état.
- 1976 – Jorge Rafael Videla seizes control of Argentina in 1976 through a coup sponsored by the Argentine military, establishing himself as a dictator of a military junta government in the country.
- 1977 – Military coup in Pakistan. Political leaders including Zulfikar Ali Bhutto were arrested, and martial law was declared.
- 1979 – An attempted coup in Iran, backed by the United States, to overthrow the interim government, which had come to power after the Iranian Revolution.
- 1979 – Coup in El Salvador, President General Carlos Humberto Romero, was overthrown by junior ranked officers, who formed a Junta government, which lead to the beginning of a 12-year civil war.

=== Terrorist attacks ===
The most notable terrorist attacks of the decade include:

- The Munich massacre takes place at the 1972 Summer Olympics in Munich, Germany, where Palestinians belonging to the terrorist group Black September organization kidnapped and murdered eleven Israeli athletes.
- Rise in the use of terrorism by militant organizations across the world. Groups in Europe like the Red Brigades and the Baader-Meinhof Gang were responsible for a spate of bombings, kidnappings, and murders. Violence continued in Northern Ireland and the Middle East. Radical American groups existed as well, such as the Weather Underground and the Symbionese Liberation Army, but they never achieved the size or strength of their European counterparts.
- On September 6, 1970, the world witnessed the beginnings of modern rebellious fighting in what is today called as Skyjack Sunday. Palestinian terrorists hijacked four airliners and took over 300 people on board as hostage. The hostages were later released, but the planes were blown up.

=== Prominent political events ===
Worldwide

- 1973 oil crisis and 1979 energy crisis
- The presence and rise of a significant number of women as heads of state and heads of government in a number of countries across the world, many being the first women to hold such positions, such as Soong Ching-ling continuing as the first Chairwoman of the People's Republic of China until 1972, Isabel Perón as the first woman president in Argentina in 1974 until being deposed in 1976, Elisabeth Domitien becomes the first woman prime minister of Central African Republic, Indira Gandhi continuing as Prime Minister of India until 1977, Lidia Gueiler Tejada becoming the interim president of Bolivia beginning from 1979 to 1980, Maria de Lourdes Pintasilgo becoming the first woman prime minister of Portugal in 1979, and Margaret Thatcher becoming the first woman prime minister of the United Kingdom in 1979.

Americas

Nixon displays the V-for-victory sign as he departs the White House after resigning

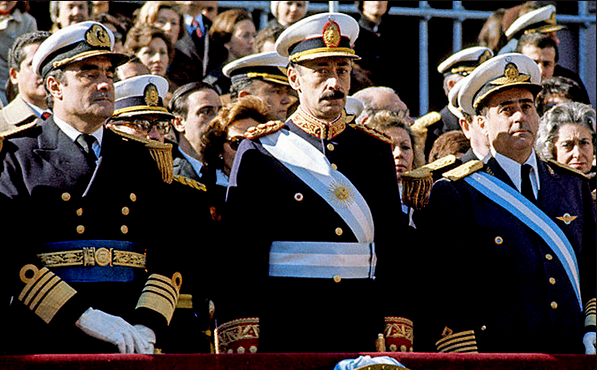
The first Military Junta after the 1976 Coup d'État in Argentina, integrated by Jorge Videla, Emilio Massera and Orlando Agosti

- United States President Richard Nixon resigned as president on August 9, 1974, while facing charges for impeachment for the Watergate scandal.
- Augusto Pinochet rose to power as ruler of Chile after overthrowing the country's Socialist president Salvador Allende in 1973 with the assistance of the Central Intelligence Agency (CIA) of the United States. Pinochet would remain the dictator of Chile until 1990.
- Argentine president Isabel Perón begins the Dirty War, where the military and security forces hunt down left-wing political dissidents as part of Operation Condor. She is overthrown in a military coup in 1976, and Jorge Rafael Videla comes to power and continues the Dirty War until the military junta relinquished power in 1983.
- Suriname was granted independence from the Netherlands on November 25, 1975.
- In Guyana, the Rev. Jim Jones led several hundred people from his People's Temple in California to create and maintain a Utopian Marxist commune in the jungle named Jonestown. Amid allegations of corruption, mental, sexual, and physical abuse by Jones on his followers, and denying them the right to leave Jonestown, a Congressional committee and journalists visited Guyana to investigate in November 1978. The visitors (and several of those trying to leave Jonestown with them) were attacked and shot by Jones' guards at the airport while trying to depart Guyana together. Congressman Leo Ryan was among those who were shot to death. The demented Jones then ordered everyone in the commune to kill themselves. The people drank or were forced to drink, cyanide-laced fruit punch (Flavor Aid). A total of over 900 dead were found (approximately 1/3 of which were children), including Jones, who had shot himself. Multiple units of the United States military were organized, mobilized, and sent to Guyana to recover over 900 deceased Jonestown residents. After rejections from the Guyanese Government for the United States to bury the Jonestown dead in Guyana, US military personnel were then tasked to prepare and transport the human remains from Guyana for burial in the USA. The US General Accounting Office later detailed an approximate cost of $4.4 million (in taxpayer dollars) for Jonestown's clean-up and recovery operation expenses.
- The Somoza dictatorship in Nicaragua is ousted in 1979 by the Sandinista National Liberation Front, leading to the Contra War in the 1980s.
- Greenland was granted self-government within the Kingdom of Denmark on November 29, 1979.

Europe

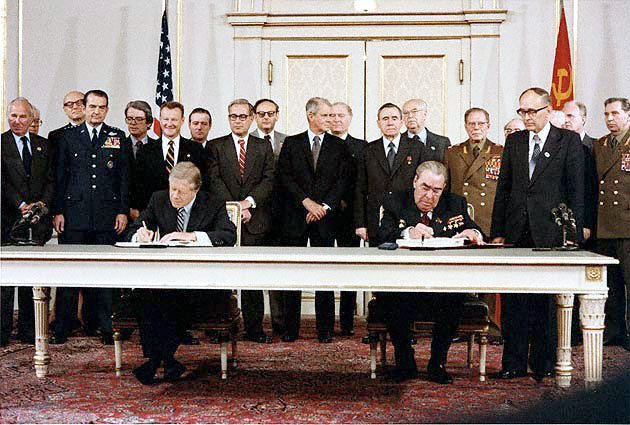
United States President Jimmy Carter and Soviet premier Leonid Brezhnev sign the SALT II treaty, June 18, 1979, in Vienna, Austria

- Margaret Thatcher and the Conservative party rose to power in the United Kingdom in 1979, initiating a neoliberal economic policy of reducing government spending, weakening the power of trade unions, and promoting economic and trade liberalization.
- Francisco Franco died after 39 years in power. Juan Carlos I was crowned king of Spain and called for the reintroduction of democracy. The dictatorship in Spain ended. The first general elections were held in 1977 and Adolfo Suárez became Prime minister of Spain after his Centrist Democratic Union won. The Socialist and Communist parties were legalized. The current Spanish Constitution was signed in 1978.
- In 1972, Erich Honecker was chosen to lead East Germany, a role he would fill for the whole of the 1970s and 1980s. The mid-1970s were a time of extreme recession for East Germany, and as a result of the country's higher debts, consumer goods became more and more scarce. If East Germans had enough money to procure a television set, a telephone, or a Trabant automobile, they were placed on waiting lists which caused them to wait as much as a decade for the item in question.
- The Troubles in Northern Ireland continued, with an explosion of political violence erupting in the early 1970s. Notable attacks include the McGurk's Bar bombing, the Bloody Sunday massacre, and the Dublin and Monaghan bombings.
- The Soviet Union under the leadership of Leonid Brezhnev, having the largest armed forces and the largest stockpile of nuclear weapons in the world, pursued an agenda to lessen tensions with its rival superpower, the United States, for most of the seventies. That policy, known as détente, abruptly ended with the Soviet invasion in Afghanistan at the end of 1979. While known as a "period of stagnation" in Soviet historiography, the Seventies are largely considered as a sort of a golden age of the USSR in terms of stability and relative well-being. Nevertheless, hidden inflation continued to increase for the second straight decade, and production consistently fell short of demand in agriculture and consumer goods manufacturing. By the end of the 1970s, signs of social and economic stagnation were becoming very pronounced.
- Enver Hoxha's rule in Albania was characterized in the 1970s by growing isolation, first from a very public schism with the Soviet Union the decade before, and then by a split in friendly relations with China in 1978. Albania normalized relations with Yugoslavia in 1971, and attempted trade agreements with other European nations, but was met with vocal disapproval by the United Kingdom and the United States.
- In 1977 the Silver Jubilee of Queen Elizabeth II was the international celebration marking the 25th anniversary of the accession of Elizabeth II to the thrones of seven countries.
- 1978 would become known as the "Year of Three Popes". In August, Paul VI, who had ruled since 1963, died. His successor was Cardinal Albino Luciano, who took the name John Paul. But only 33 days later, he was found dead, and the Catholic Church had to elect another pope. On October 16, Karol Wojtyła, a Polish cardinal, was elected, becoming Pope John Paul II. He was the first non-Italian pope since 1523.

Asia

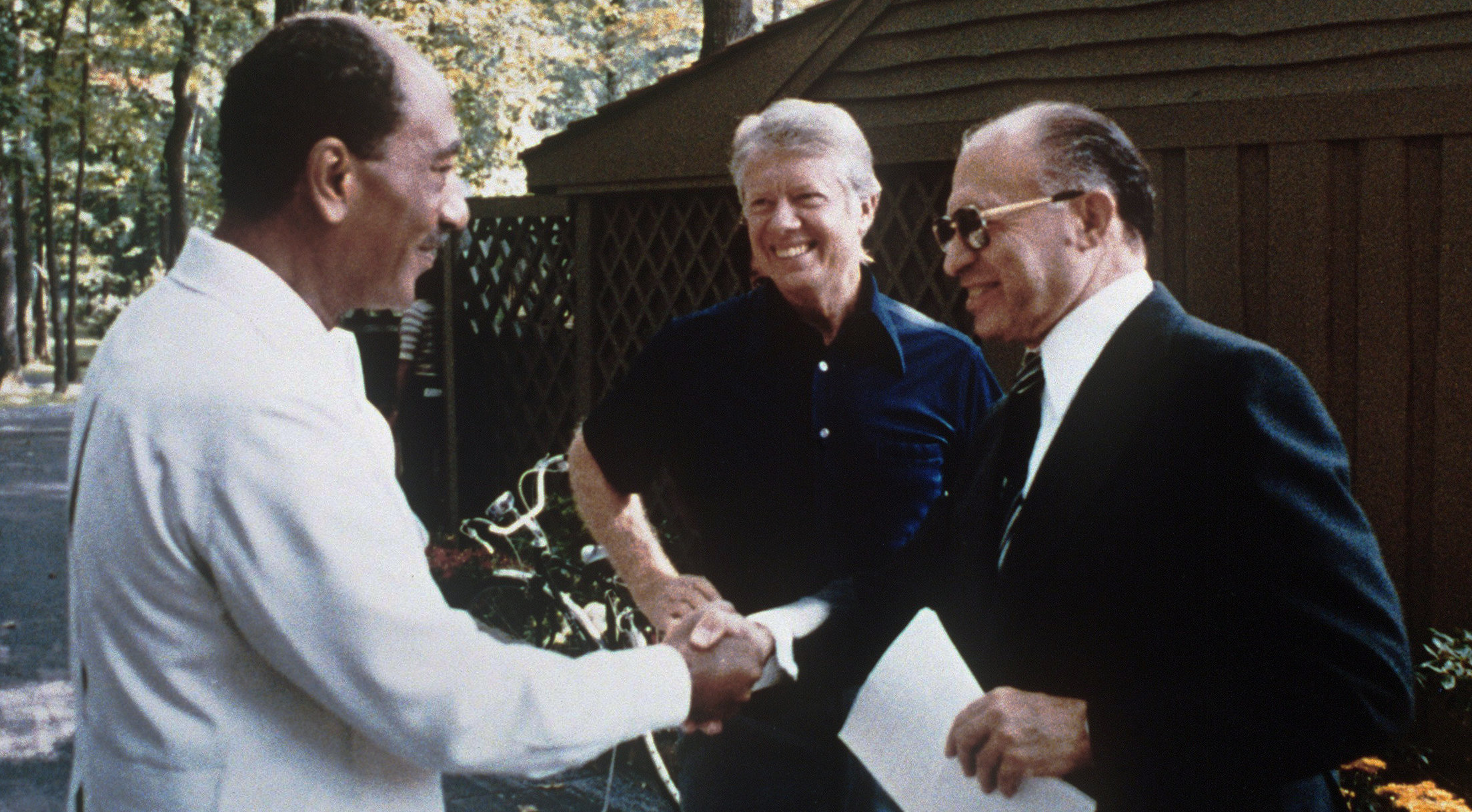
Israeli prime minister Menachem Begin and Egyptian president Anwar Sadat shake hands, Camp David, 1978

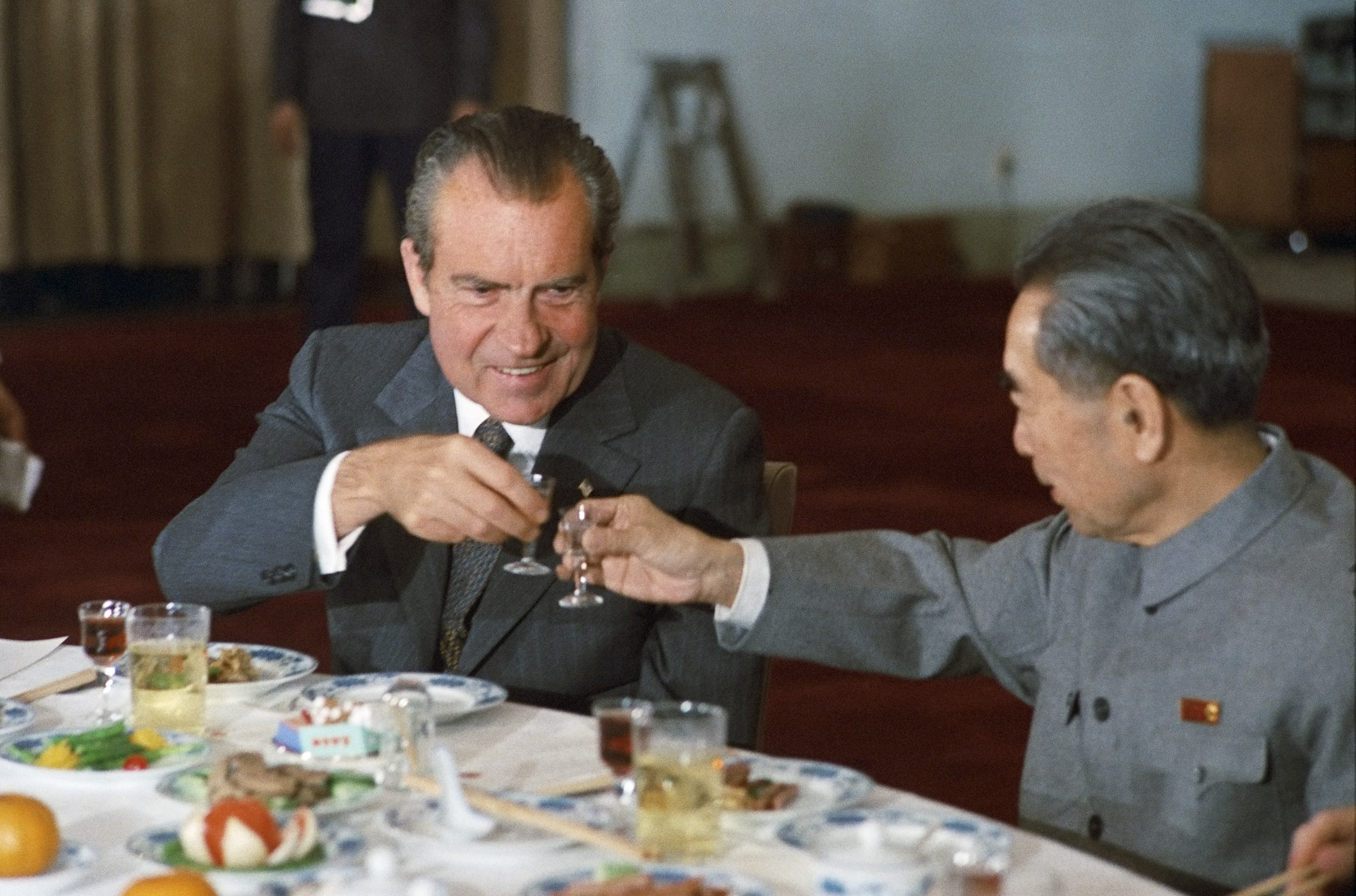
Nixon and Zhou toast, 1972

- On September 17, 1978, the Camp David Accords were signed between Israel and Egypt. The Accords led directly to the 1979 Egypt–Israel peace treaty. They also resulted in Sadat and Begin sharing the 1978 Nobel Peace Prize.
- Major changes in the People's Republic of China. US president Richard Nixon visited the country in 1972 following visits by Henry Kissinger in 1971, restoring relations between the two countries, although formal diplomatic ties were not established until 1979. In 1976, Mao Zedong and Zhou Enlai both died, leading to the end of the Cultural Revolution and the beginning of a new era. After the brief rule of Mao's chosen successor Hua Guofeng, Deng Xiaoping emerged as China's paramount leader, and began to shift the country towards market economics and away from ideologically driven policies. In 1979, Deng Xiaoping visited the US.
- In 1971, the representatives of Chiang Kai-shek, then-President of the Republic of China (Taiwan), were expelled from the United Nations and replaced by the People's Republic of China. Chiang Kai-shek died in 1975, and in 1978 his son Chiang Ching-kuo became president, beginning a shift towards democratization in Taiwan.
- In Iraq, Saddam Hussein began to rise to power by helping to modernize the country. One major initiative was removing the Western monopoly on oil, which later during the high prices of 1973 oil crisis would help Hussein's ambitious plans. On July 16, 1979, he assumed the presidency cementing his rise to power. His presidency led to the breaking off of a Syrian-Iraqi unification, which had been sought under his predecessor Ahmed Hassan al-Bakr and would lead to the Iran–Iraq War starting in the 1980s.
- Japan's economic growth surpassed the rest of the world in the 1970s, unseating the United States as the world's foremost industrial power.
- On April 17, 1975, the Khmer Rouge, led by Pol Pot, took over Cambodia's capital Phnom Penh.
  - From 1975 to 1979, the Khmer Rouge carried out the Cambodian genocide that killed nearly two million.
- On April 13, 1975, the Lebanese Civil War began.
- In 1978, Zia ul Haq came to power in Pakistan after deposing Zulfiqar Ali Bhutto in a military coup.
  - In 1979, Zulfiqar Ali Bhutto is hanged in jail.

Africa

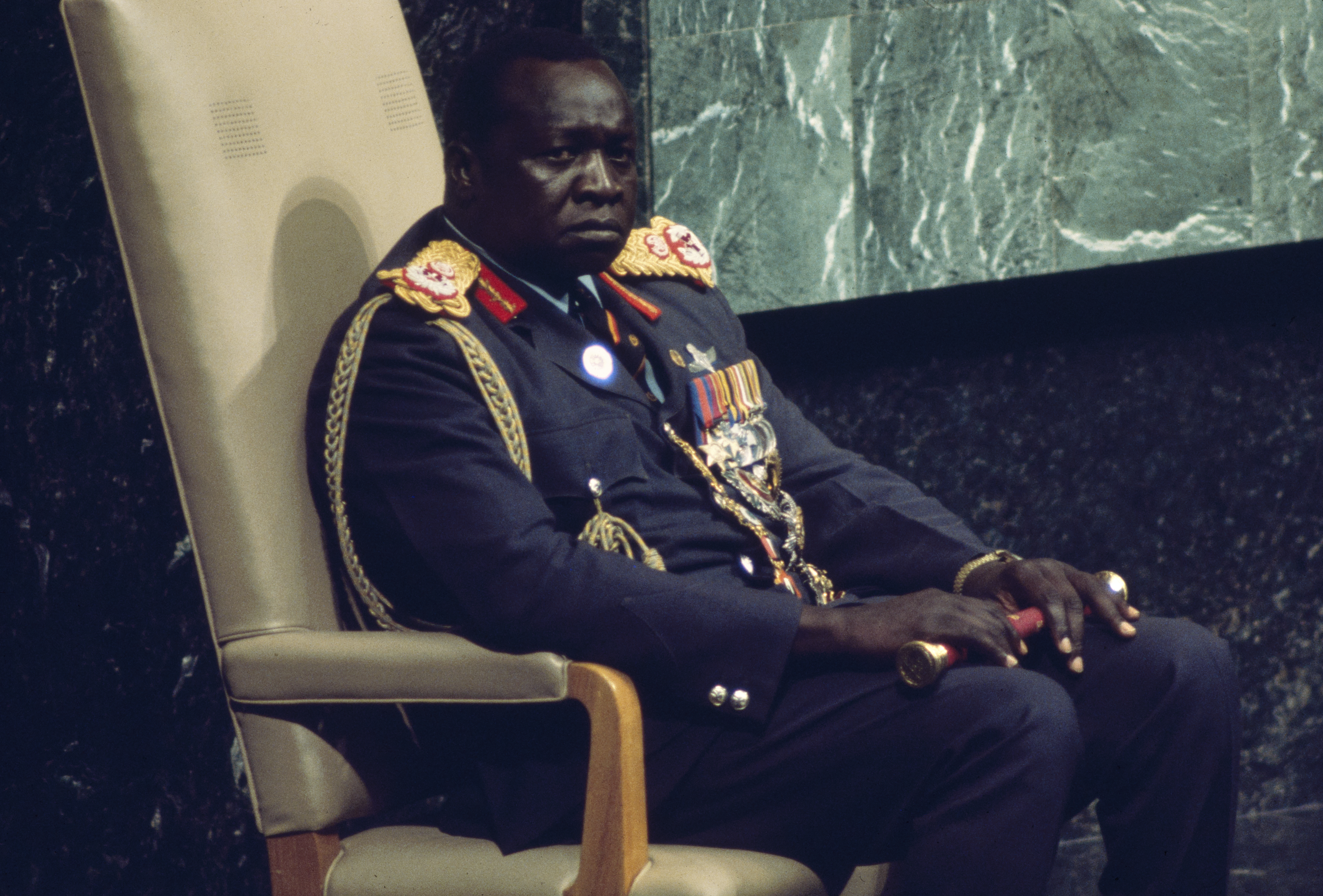
Idi Amin

- Idi Amin, President of Uganda from 1971 to 1979, after rising to power in a coup became infamous for his brutal dictatorship in Uganda. Amin's regime persecuted opposition to his rule and pursued a racist agenda of removing Asians from Uganda (particularly Indians who arrived in Uganda during British colonial rule). Amin initiated the Ugandan–Tanzanian War in 1978 in alliance with Libya based on an expansionist agenda to annex territory from Tanzania which resulted in Ugandan defeat and Amin's overthrow in 1979.
- South African activist Steve Biko died in 1977.
- Francisco Macías Nguema ruled Equatorial Guinea as a brutal dictator from 1969 until his overthrow and execution in 1979.
- Jean-Bédel Bokassa, who had ruled the Central African Republic since 1965, proclaimed himself Emperor Bokassa I and renamed his impoverished country the Central African Empire in 1977. He was overthrown two years later and went into exile.

== Disasters ==
=== Natural disasters ===
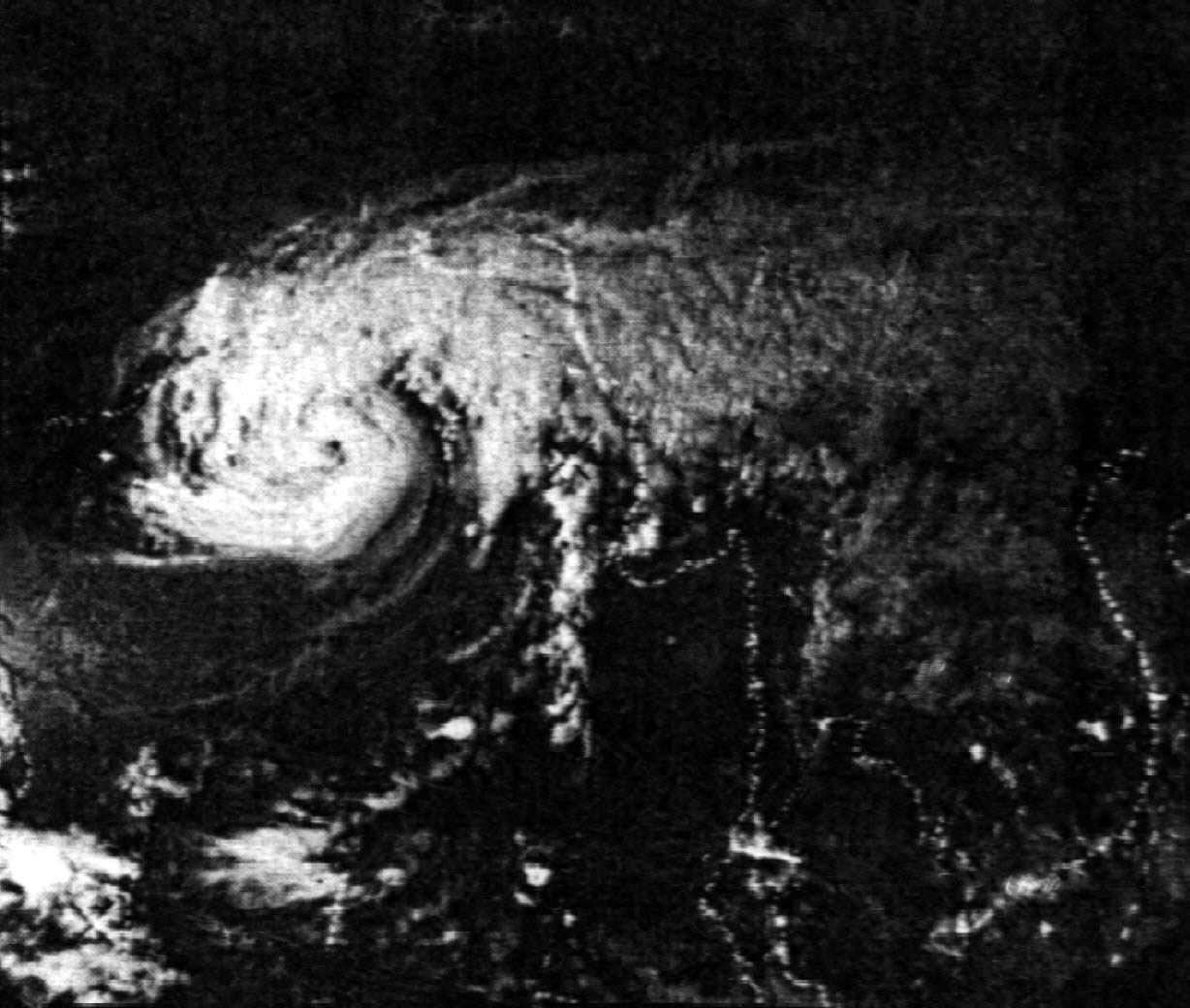
The 1970 Bhola cyclone, considered the 20th century's worst cyclone disaster, kills an estimated 500,000 people in the densely populated Ganges Delta region of East Pakistan during November 1970.

- On January 5, 1970, the 7.1 M_{w} Tonghai earthquake shakes Tonghai County, Yunnan, China, with a maximum Mercalli intensity of X (Extreme). Between 10,000 and 14,621 were killed and 26,783 were injured.
- On May 31, 1970, the 1970 Ancash earthquake caused a landslide that buried the town of Yungay in Peru; more than 47,000 people were killed.
- The 1970 Bhola cyclone, a 120 mph (193 km/h) tropical cyclone, hit the densely populated Ganges Delta region of East Pakistan (now Bangladesh) on November 12 and 13, 1970, killing an estimated 500,000 people. The storm remains to date the deadliest tropical cyclone in world history.
- On October 29, 1971, the 1971 Odisha cyclone in the Bay of Bengal, in the Indian state of Odisha, killed 10,000 people.
- June, 1972, Hurricane Agnes hit the east coast of the United States, resulting in 128 deaths and causing over $2.1 billion in damage.
- On April 3, 1974, the 1974 Super Outbreak occurred in the U.S. producing 148 tornadoes and killing a total of 330 people.
- On December 24, 1974, Cyclone Tracy devastated the Australian city of Darwin.
- Bangladesh famine of 1974 — Official records claim a death toll of 26,000. However, various sources claim about 1,000,000.
- On August 8, 1975, the Banqiao Dam, in China's Henan, failed after a freak typhoon; over 200,000 people perished.
- On February 4, 1976, a major earthquake in Guatemala and Honduras killed more than 22,000.
- On July 28, 1976, a 7.5 earthquake flattened Tangshan, China, killing 242,769 people and injuring 164,851.
- On August 17, 1976, a magnitude 8 earthquake struck the Moro Gulf near the island of Sulu in Mindanao, Philippines, causing a tsunami killing 5,000 to 8,000 people.
- Super Typhoon Tip affected areas in the southwestern Pacific Ocean from October 4–19, 1979. Off the coast of Guam, Tip became the largest and most powerful tropical cyclone ever recorded, with a gale diameter of almost 1,400 miles, 190-mph winds, and a record intensity of 870 millibars.

=== Non-natural disasters ===
- On October 2, 1970, a plane carrying the Wichita State University football team crashed into a mountain near Logan, Utah, killing 31 with 9 survivors.
- On November 14, 1970, Southern Airways Flight 932 carrying the entire Marshall (West Virginia) football team and boosters crashed into a mountainside near Ceredo, West Virginia, on approach to Tri-State Airport in heavy rain and fog. They were returning from a road game loss at East Carolina University in Greenville, North Carolina. There were no survivors.
- On July 30, 1971, All Nippon Airways Flight 58 collided with a JASDF fighter plane, killing all 162 on board. The JASDF pilot survived.
- On October 13, 1972, Uruguayan Air Force Flight 571 from Uruguay to Chile crashed in the Andes mountains. Survivors suffered from freezing temperatures, exposure and starvation for 72 days until their rescue on December 23.
- On December 29, 1972, Eastern Air Lines Flight 401 crashed in the Florida Everglades while its crew was distracted. 101 people died in the accident while 75 survived.
- On January 22, 1973, an Alia Boeing 707, chartered by Nigeria Airways, crashed upon landing at Nigeria's Kano Airport after one of its landing gear struts collapsed. 176 of the 202 people on board perished, leaving 26 survivors.
- On March 3, 1974, Turkish Airlines Flight 981 crashed in northern France after a cargo hatch blowout, killing all 346 people aboard.
- On April 4, 1975, the rear loading ramp on a USAF Lockheed C-5 Galaxy blew open mid-flight, causing explosive decompression that crippled the aircraft. 153 were killed in the incident while 175 survived.
- On November 10, 1975, the U.S. Great Lakes bulk freighter SS Edmund Fitzgerald foundered on Lake Superior with the loss of all 29 crewmen.
- On September 10, 1976, in the Zagreb mid-air collision, a British Airways Hawker Siddeley Trident and an Inex-Adria Aviopromet Douglas DC-9 collided near Zagreb, Yugoslavia (now Croatia), killing all 176 aboard both planes and another person on the ground.
- On March 27, 1977, two Boeing 747s (a KLM and a Pan Am) collided on the runway in heavy fog at Los Rodeos Airport in Tenerife, Canary Islands, Spain, killing 583 people – the worst aviation disaster on record.
- On January 1, 1978, Air India Flight 855 crashed into the sea off the coast of India, killing all 213 aboard.
- On September 25, 1978, PSA Flight 182 collided with a private Cessna 172 over San Diego, California, and crashed into a local neighborhood. All 135 on the PSA aircraft, both pilots of the Cessna, and 7 people on the ground (144 total) were killed.
- On May 25, 1979, American Airlines Flight 191, outbound from O'Hare International Airport in Chicago, Illinois, lost an engine during take-off and crashed, killing all 271 on board and 2 others on the ground. It was and remains the deadliest single-plane crash on American soil.
- On November 28, 1979, Air New Zealand Flight 901 crashed on the flanks of Mount Erebus in Antarctica, killing all 257 people on board.
- On March 28, 1979, there was a partial meltdown of the Three Mile Island Unit 2 reactor in Pennsylvania, United States. It is the most significant accident in U.S. commercial nuclear power plant history.

== Worldwide trends ==
Superpower tensions had cooled by the 1970s, with the bellicose US–Soviet confrontations of the 1950s–60s giving way to the policy of détente, which promoted the idea that the world's problems could be resolved at the negotiating table. Détente was partially a reaction against the policies of the previous 25 years, which had brought the world dangerously close to nuclear war on several occasions, and because the US was in a weakened position following the failure of the Vietnam War. As part of détente, the US also restored ties with the People's Republic of China, partially as a counterweight against Soviet expansionism.

The US–Soviet geopolitical rivalry nonetheless continued through the decade, although in a more indirect faction as the two superpowers jockeyed relentlessly for control of smaller countries. American and Soviet intelligence agencies gave funding, training, and material support to insurgent groups, governments, and armies across the globe, each seeking to gain a geopolitical advantage and install friendly governments. Coups, civil wars, and terrorism went on across Asia, Africa, and Latin America, and also in Europe where a spate of Soviet-backed Marxist terrorist groups were active throughout the decade. Over half the world's population in the 1970s lived under a repressive dictatorship. In 1979, a new wrinkle appeared in the form of Islamic fundamentalism, as the Shi'a theocracy of Ayatollah Ruhollah Khomeini overthrew the Shah of Iran and declared itself hostile to both Western democracy and godless communism.

People were deeply influenced by the rapid pace of societal change and the aspiration for a more egalitarian society in cultures that were long colonized and have an even longer history of hierarchical social structure.

The Green Revolution of the late 1960s brought about self-sufficiency in food in many developing economies. At the same time an increasing number of people began to seek urban prosperity over agrarian life. This consequently saw the duality of transition of diverse interaction across social communities amid increasing information blockade across social class.

Another common global ethos of the 1970s world included increasingly flexible and varied gender roles for women in industrialized societies. More women could enter the workforce. However, the gender role of men remained as that of a breadwinner. The period also saw the socioeconomic effect of an ever-increasing number of women entering the non-agrarian economic workforce. The Iranian revolution also affected global attitudes toward and among those of the Muslim faith toward the end of the 1970s.

The global experience of the cultural transition of the 1970s and an experience of a global zeitgeist revealed the interdependence of economies since World War II, in a world increasingly polarized between the United States and the Soviet Union.

== Assassinations and attempts ==
Prominent assassinations, targeted killings, and assassination attempts include:

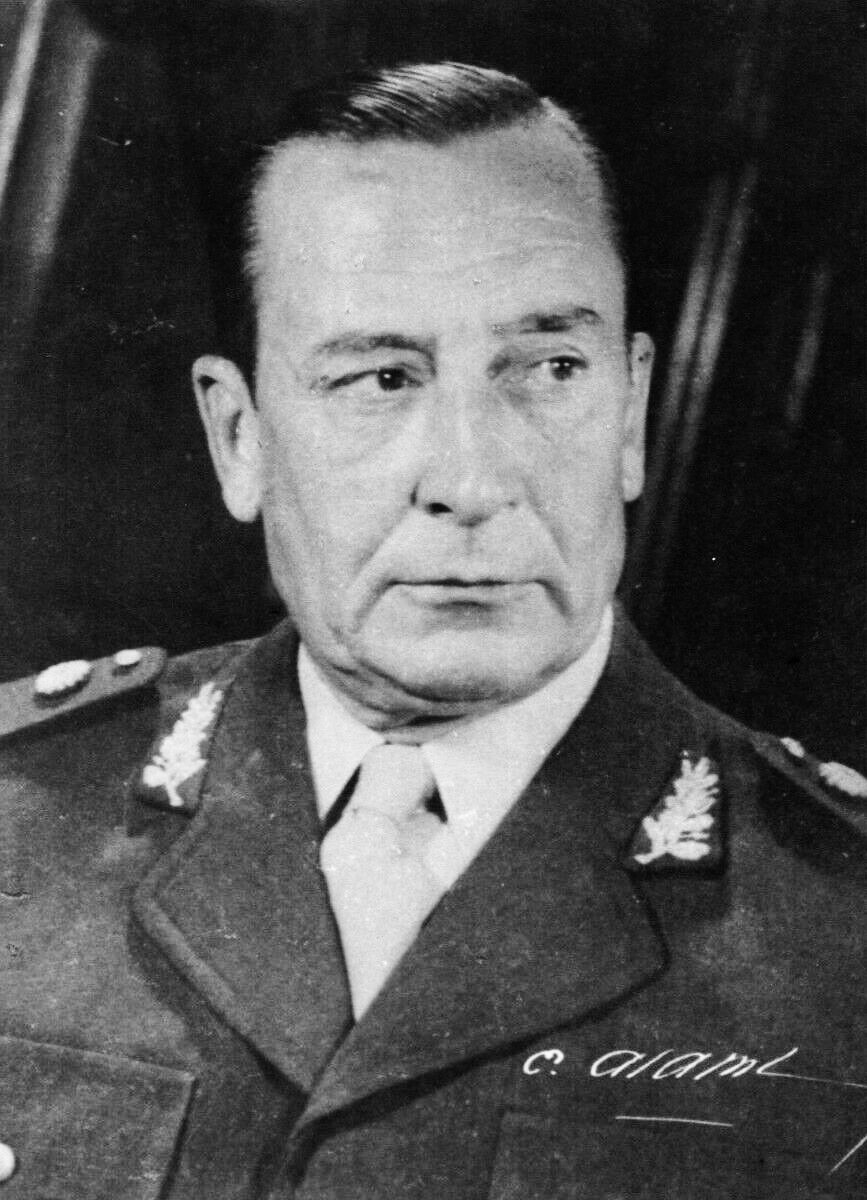
Pedro Eugenio Aramburu

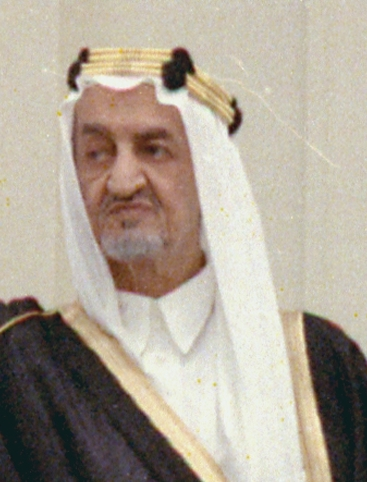
King Faisal bin Abdulaziz Al Saud

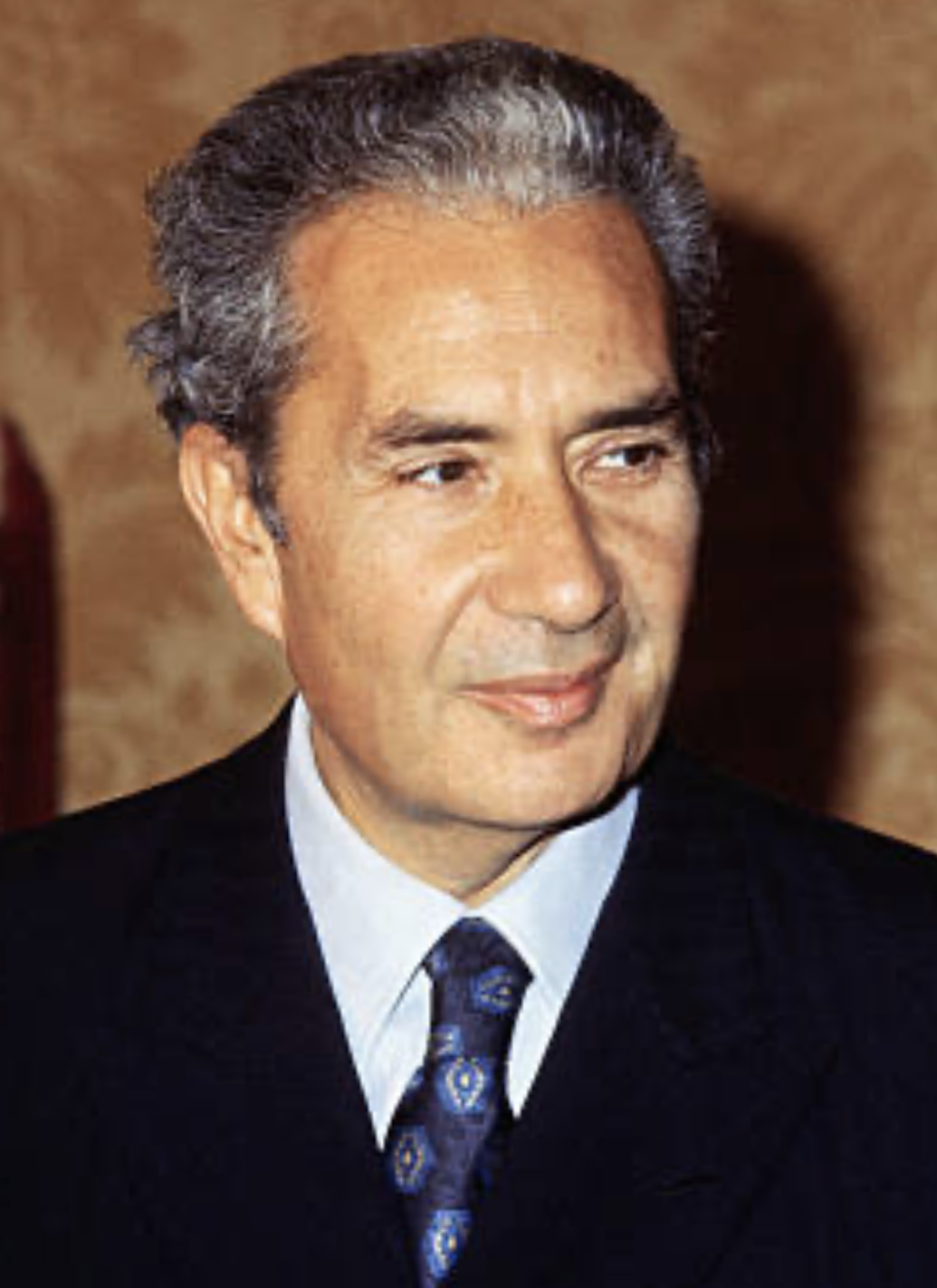
Aldo Moro

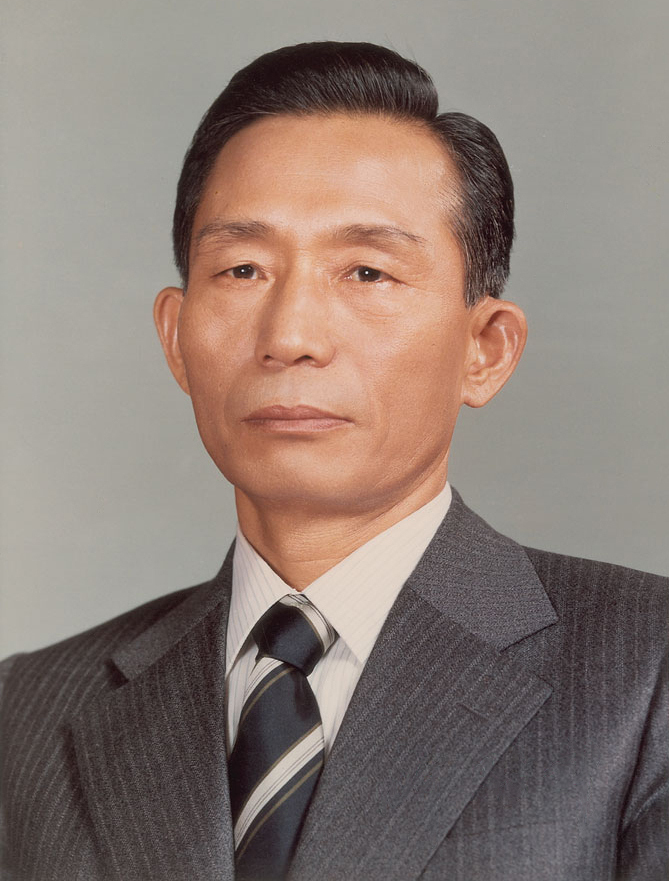
Park Chung Hee

| Date | Description |
|---|---|
| 1 June 1970 | Pedro Eugenio Aramburu, former president of Argentina, is kidnapped and killed by the Montoneros, a guerrilla organization. |
| 27 November 1970 | Pope Paul VI is nearly stabbed by Bolivian painter Benjamín Mendoza in Manila, Philippines during a papal visit to the country |
| 19 April 1972 | Ntare V, the final King of Burundi, was detained and assassinated upon his return from exile. |
| 15 May 1972 | George Wallace, Governor of Alabama, is shot and paralyzed by Arthur Bremer at a presidential campaign rally in Laurel, Maryland. |
| 7 December 1972 | Imelda Marcos, First Lady of the Philippines, is injured in a stabbing attack by Carlito Dimahilig on live television within the Nayong Pilipino theme park in Pasay City. |
| 25 March 1975 | Faisal bin Abdulaziz Al Saud, King of Saudi Arabia, is assassinated by his half-brother's son, Faisal bin Musaid. |
| 15 August 1975 | Sheikh Mujibur Rahman, 1st and 5th President of Bangladesh, and almost his entire family was assassinated when a group of Bangladesh Army personnel went to his residence and killed him, during a coup d'état. |
| 27 August 1975 | Haile Selassie, former Emperor of Ethiopia, is strangled to death in his bed at the Jubilee Palace, Addis Ababa by military officers associated with the Derg regime, with his murder covered up as a death caused by "respiratory failure". |
| 5 and 22 September 1975 | Gerald Ford, 38th President of the United States, survives two attempts on his life in September 1975 when two separate women open fire on him at two different events. The first occurring in Sacramento, and the second occurring in San Francisco. |
| 27 October 1975 | Guillermo de Vega, chief censor and presidential assistant of Philippine President Ferdinand Marcos, is shot and killed in Malacañang Palace by tabloid writer Paulino Arceo; Rocio de Vega, his widow, replaced him as chief censor. |
| 28 April 1978 | Mohammad Daoud Khan, first President of Afghanistan, is killed by People's Democratic Party of Afghanistan affiliated military officers during the Saur Revolution. |
| 9 May 1978 | Aldo Moro, former prime minister of Italy, is kidnapped and later killed by the Red Brigades, an Italian Marxist organization. |
| 27 November 1978 | George Moscone, mayor of San Francisco, and Harvey Milk, a member of the San Francisco Board of Supervisors and the first openly gay man elected to public office in California, are assassinated in San Francisco City Hall by former supervisor Dan White; White is later convicted of voluntary manslaughter, sparking the White Night riots. |
| 26 October 1979 | Park Chung Hee, President of South Korea, is assassinated by KCIA director Kim Jae-gyu during a dinner at the Blue House in Seoul. |
| 27 October 1979 | Hafizullah Amin, leader of Democratic Republic of Afghanistan, is assassinated by the Soviet Union in the early stages of the Soviet–Afghan War. |

== Economy ==
The 1970s were perhaps the worst decade of most industrialized countries' economic performance since the Great Depression. Although there was no severe economic depression as witnessed in the 1930s, economic growth rates were considerably lower than previous decades. As a result, the 1970s adversely distinguished itself from the prosperous postwar period between 1945 and 1973. The oil shocks of 1973 and 1979 added to the existing ailments and conjured high inflation throughout much of the world for the rest of the decade. U.S. manufacturing industries began to decline as a result, with the United States running its last trade surplus (as of 2009) in 1975. In contrast, Japan and West Germany experienced economic booms and started overtaking the U.S. as the world's leading manufacturers. In 1970, Japan overtook West Germany to become the world's second-largest economy. Japan would rank as the world's second-largest economy until 1994 when the European Economic Area (18 countries under a single market) came into effect.

In the US, the average annual inflation rate from 1900 to 1970 was approximately 2.5%. From 1970 to 1979, however, the average rate was 7.06%, and topped out at 13.29% in December 1979. This period is also known for stagflation, a phenomenon in which inflation and unemployment steadily increased. It led to double-digit interest rates that rose to unprecedented levels (above 12% per year). The prime rate hit 21.5 in December 1980, the highest in history. A rising cost of housing was reflected in the average price of a new home in the U.S. The average price of a new home in the U.S. was $23,450 in 1970 up to $68,700 by 1980. By the time of 1980, when U.S. president Jimmy Carter was running for re-election against Ronald Reagan, the misery index (the sum of the unemployment rate and the inflation rate) had reached an all-time high of 21.98%. The economic problems of the 1970s would result in a sluggish cynicism replacing the optimistic attitudes of the 1950s and 1960s and a distrust of government and technology. Faith in government was at an all-time low in the aftermath of Vietnam and Watergate, as exemplified by the low voter turnout in the 1976 United States presidential election. There was also the 1973–74 stock market crash.

Great Britain also experienced considerable economic turmoil during the decade as outdated industries proved unable to compete with Japanese and German wares. Labor strikes happened with such frequency as to almost paralyze the country's infrastructure. Following the Winter of Discontent, Margaret Thatcher was elected prime minister in 1979 with the purpose of implementing extreme economic reforms.

In Eastern Europe, Soviet-style command economies began showing signs of stagnation, in which successes were persistently dogged by setbacks. The oil shock increased East European, particularly Soviet, exports, but a growing inability to increase agricultural output caused growing concern to the governments of the COMECON block, and a growing dependence on food imported from democratic nations.

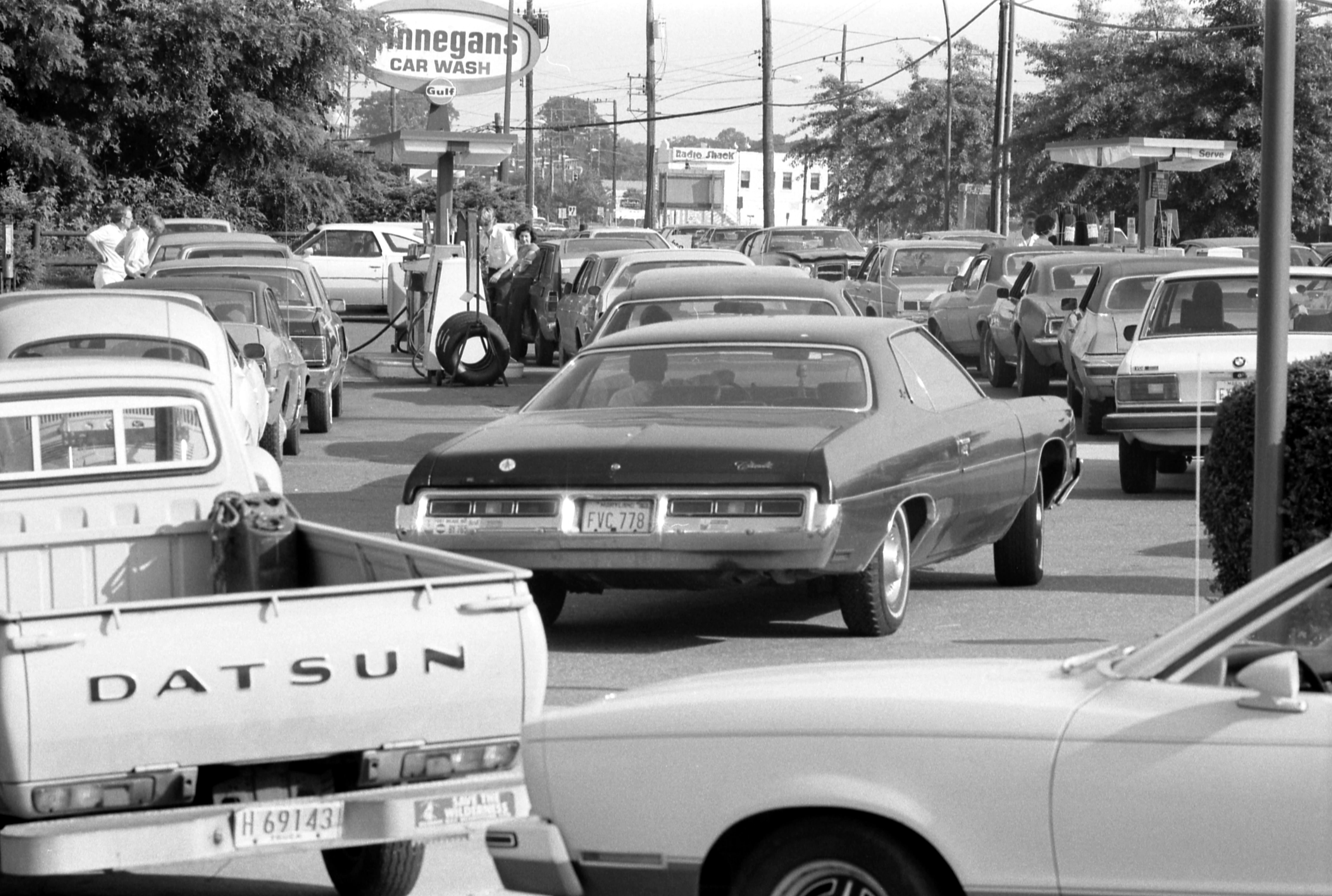
Line at a gas station in Maryland, June 15, 1979.

On the other hand, export-driven economic development in Asia, especially by the Four Asian Tigers (Hong Kong, South Korea, Singapore, and Taiwan), resulted in rapid economic transformation and industrialization. Their abundance of cheap labor, combined with educational and other policy reforms, set the foundation for development in the region during the 1970s and beyond.

=== Oil crisis ===
Economically, the 1970s were marked by the energy crisis which peaked in 1973 and 1979 (see 1973 oil crisis and 1979 oil crisis). After the first oil shock in 1973, gasoline was rationed in many countries. Europe particularly depended on the Middle East for oil; the United States was also affected even though it had its own oil reserves. Many European countries introduced car-free days and weekends. In the United States, customers with a license plate ending in an odd number were only allowed to buy gasoline on odd-numbered days, while even-numbered plate-holders could only purchase gasoline on even-numbered days. The realization that oil reserves were not endless and technological development was not sustainable without potentially harming the environment ended the belief in limitless progress that had existed since the 19th century. As a result, ecological awareness rose substantially, which had a major effect on the economy.

== Science and technology ==
=== Science ===
The 1970s witnessed an explosion in the understanding of solid-state physics, driven by the development of the integrated circuit, and the laser. Stephen Hawking developed his theories of black holes and the boundary-condition of the universe at this period with his theory called Hawking radiation. The biological sciences greatly advanced, with molecular biology, bacteriology, virology, and genetics achieving their modern forms in this decade. Biodiversity became a cause of major concern as habitat destruction, and Stephen Jay Gould's theory of punctuated equilibrium revolutionized evolutionary thought.

==== Space exploration ====
As the 1960s ended, the United States had made two successful crewed lunar landings. The Apollo 11 and later missions were celebrated worldwide, and while President John F. Kennedy's goal of landing on the Moon by the end of the 1960s was achieved some felt there was no need for further missions and that the billions of dollars spent on the space program should be put to other uses. The successful Moon landings and exploration continued through 1972, but for some the near loss of the Apollo 13 mission in April 1970 served to further anti-NASA feelings. Plans for missions after Apollo 17 were canceled, and the remaining Apollo and Saturn hardware was used for the Skylab space station program in 1973–1974, and for the Apollo–Soyuz Test Project (ASTP), which was carried out in July 1975. Many of the ambitious projects NASA had planned for the 1970s were canceled amid heavy budget cutbacks, and instead it would devote most of the decade to the development of the Space Shuttle. ASTP was the last crewed American space flight for the next five years. The year 1979 witnessed the spectacular reentry of Skylab over Australia. NASA had planned for a Shuttle mission to the space station, but the shuttles were not ready to fly until 1981, too late to save it.

Meanwhile, the Soviets, having failed in their attempt at crewed lunar landings, canceled the program in 1972. By then, however, they had already begun Salyut, the world's first space station program, which began in 1971. This would have problems of its own, especially the tragic loss of the Soyuz 11 crew in July 1971 and the near-loss of the Soyuz 18a crew during launch in April 1975. It eventually proved a success, with missions as long as six months being conducted by the end of the decade.

In terms of uncrewed missions, a variety of lunar and planetary probes were launched by the US and Soviet programs during the decade. The most successful of these include the Soviet Lunokhod program, a series of robotic lunar missions which included the first uncrewed sample return from another world, and the American Voyagers, which took advantage of a rare alignment of the outer planets to visit all of them except Pluto by the end of the 1980s.

China entered the space race in 1970 with the launching of its first satellite, but technological backwardness and limited funds would prevent the country from becoming a significant force in space exploration. Japan launched a satellite for the first time in 1972. The European Space Agency was founded during the decade as well.

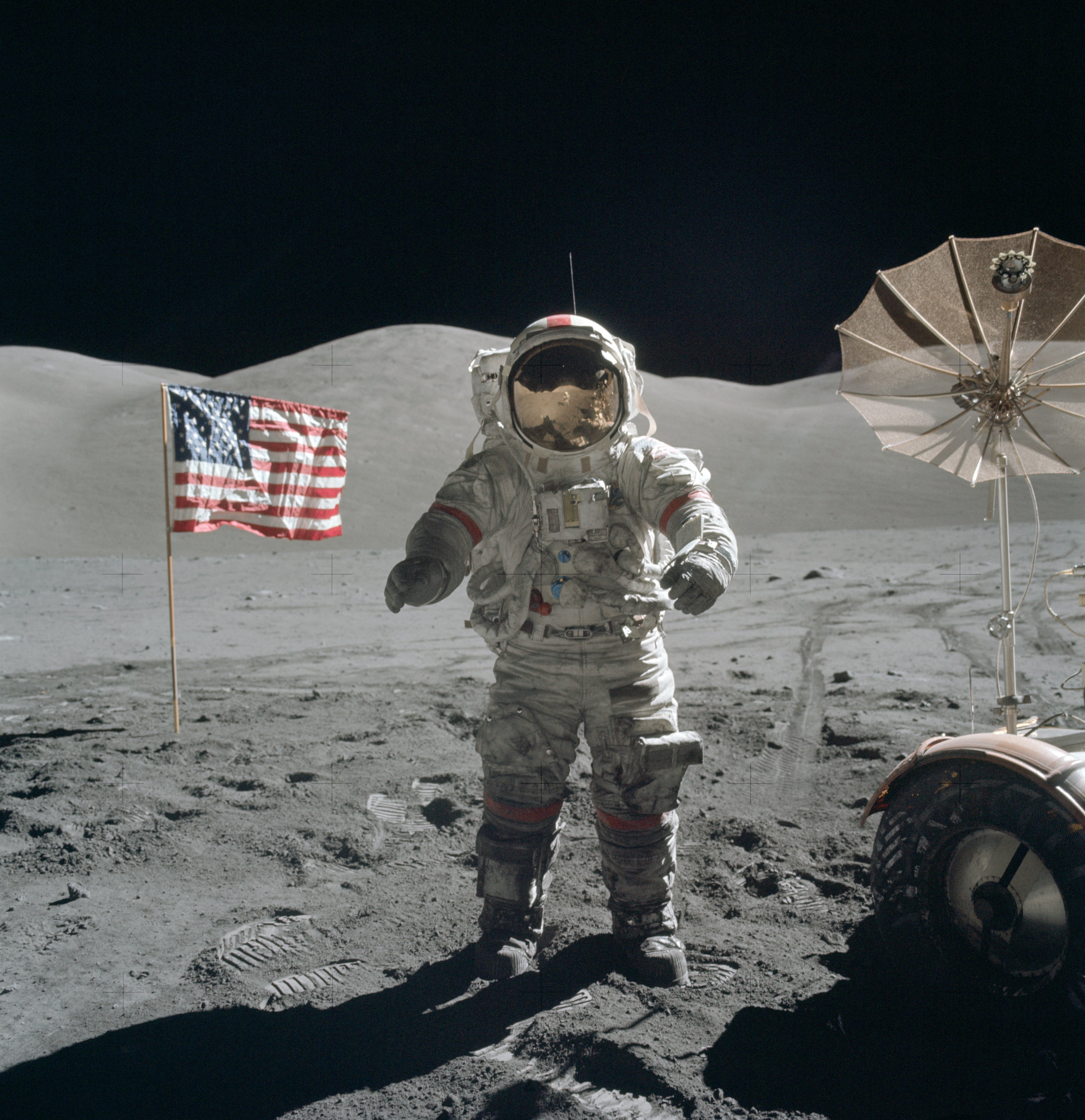
Apollo 17 Astronaut Gene Cernan becomes the last man on the Moon, December 13, 1972

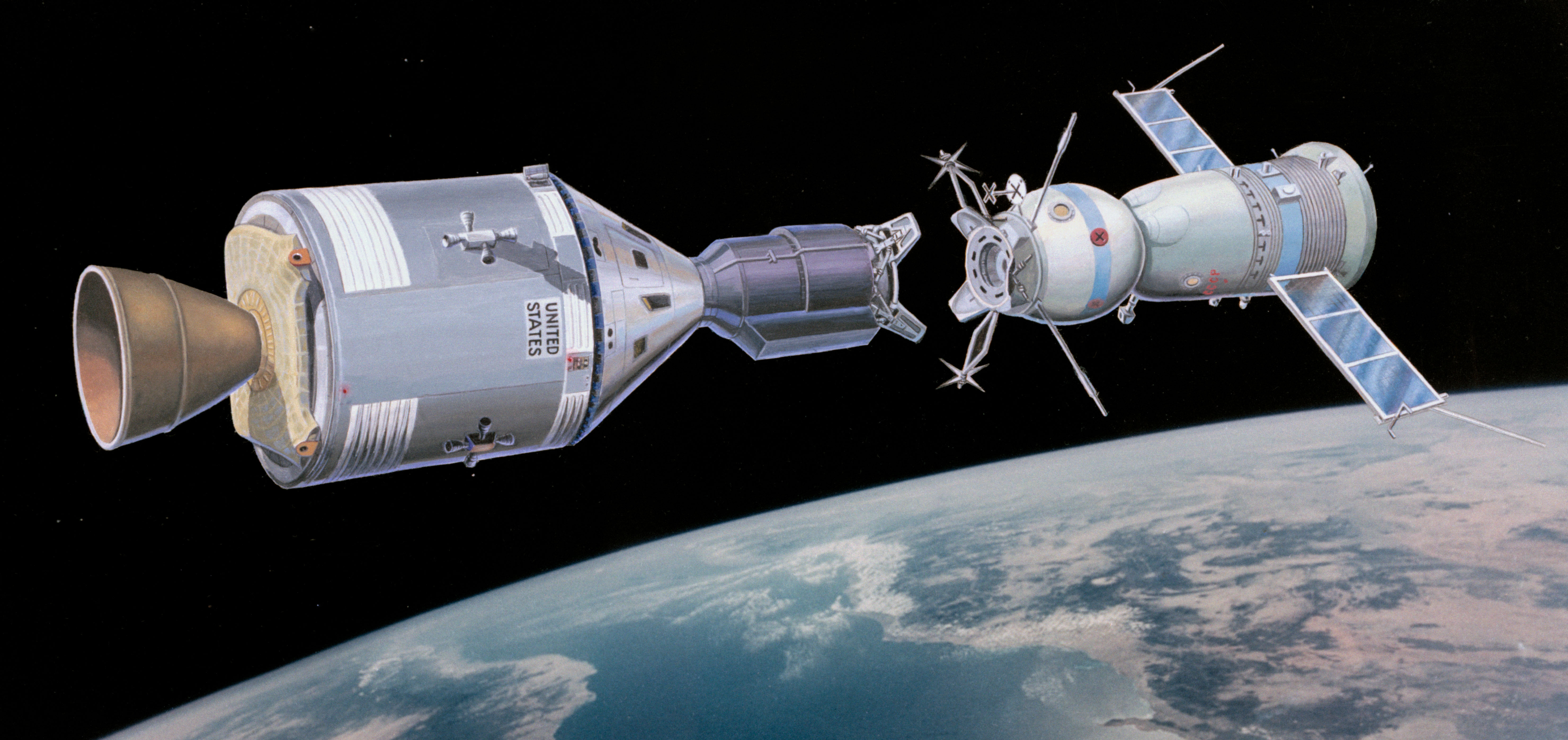
An artist impression of an American Apollo spacecraft and Soviet Soyuz spacecraft docking, a propaganda portrait for the Apollo–Soyuz Test Project mission

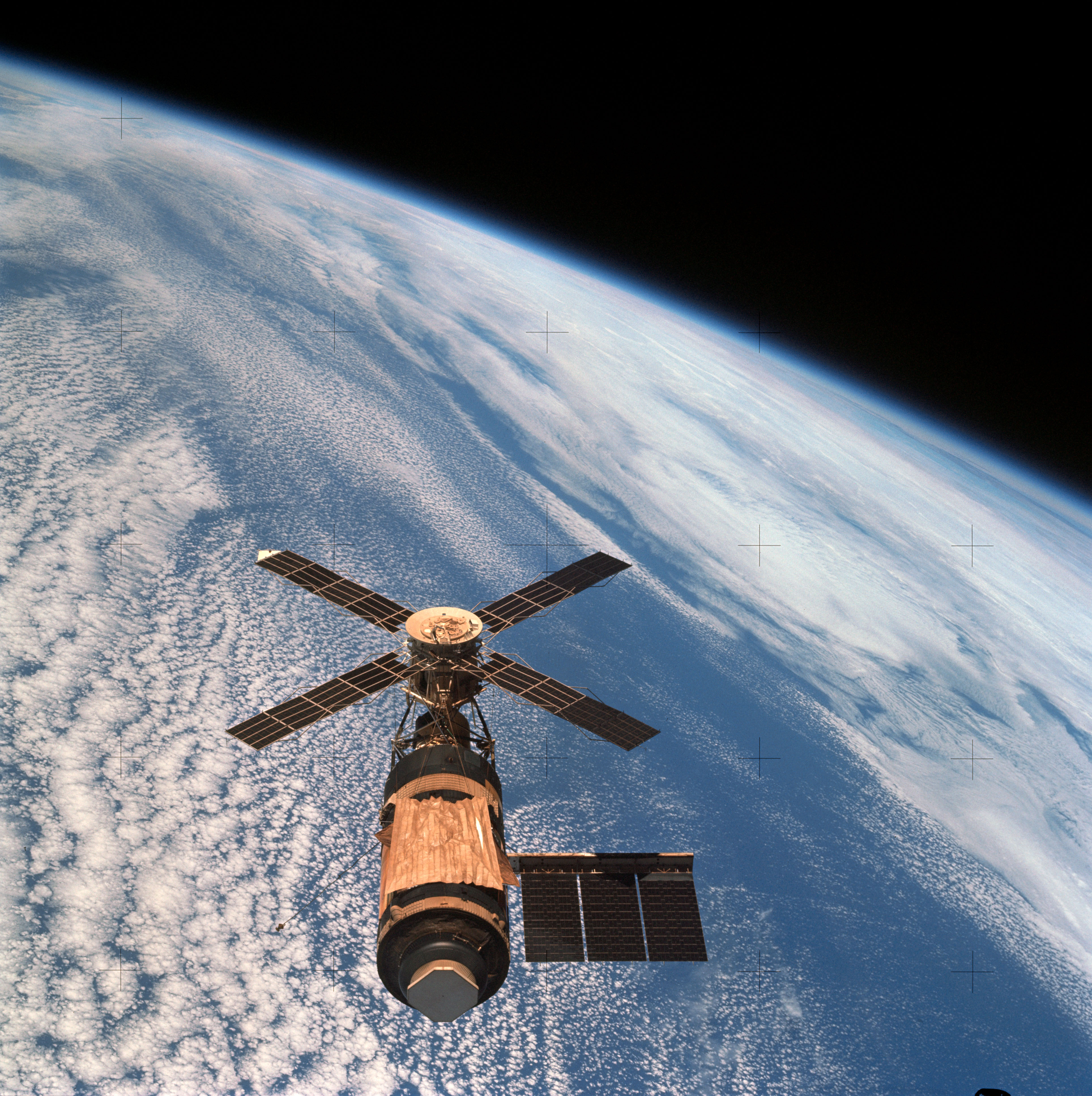
America's first space station Skylab in orbit February 8, 1974

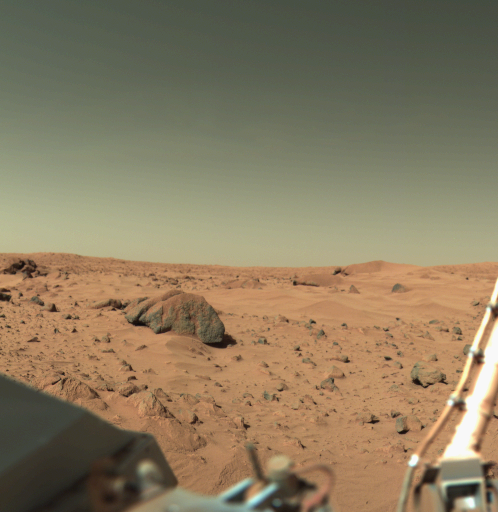
Viking 1, the first of two spacecraft sent to Mars, takes this picture of the landing site in Chryse Planitia (1978)

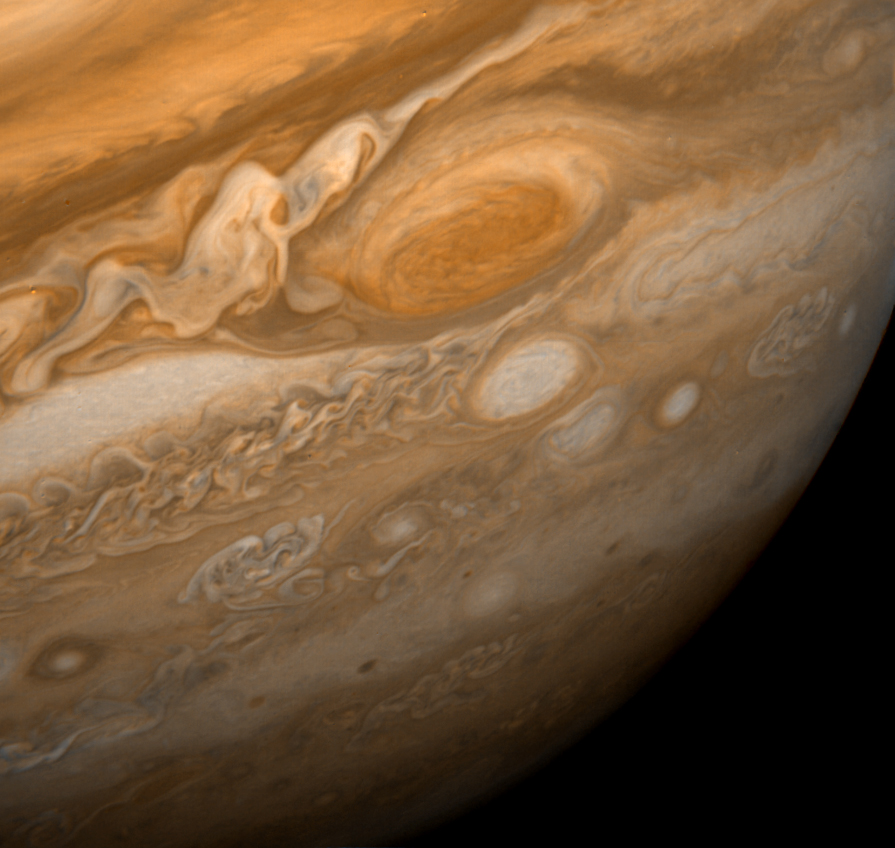
Voyager 1 passing by Jupiter's Great Red Spot February 25, 1979

==== Biology ====
- The second generation of face lifts were first attempted in the 1970s, popularizing the procedure for millions.
- The first MRI image was published in 1973.
- César Milstein and Georges Köhler reported their discovery of how to use hybridoma cells to isolate monoclonal antibodies, effectively beginning the history of monoclonal antibody use in science.
- Carl Woese and George E. Fox classified archaea as a new, separate domain of life.
- "Lucy", a fossilized hominid of the species Australopithecus afarensis, was discovered in the Afar region of Ethiopia by Donald Johanson in 1974, providing evidence for bipedalism as an early occurrence in human evolution.
- After successful vaccination campaigns throughout the 19th and 20th centuries, the WHO certified the eradication of smallpox in December 1979 after the last smallpox case in 1977.
- The first organisms genetically engineered were bacteria in 1973 and then mice in 1974.
- 1977 The first complete DNA genome to be sequenced is that of bacteriophage φX174.
- In 1978, Louise Brown became the first child to be born via in vitro fertilisation, or IVF.

==== Social science ====
Social science intersected with hard science in the works in natural language processing by Terry Winograd (1973) and the establishment of the first cognitive sciences department in the world at MIT in 1979. The fields of generative linguistics and cognitive psychology went through a renewed vigor with symbolic modeling of semantic knowledge while the final devastation of the long-standing tradition of behaviorism came about through the severe criticism of B. F. Skinner's work in 1971 by the cognitive scientist Noam Chomsky.

=== Technology ===
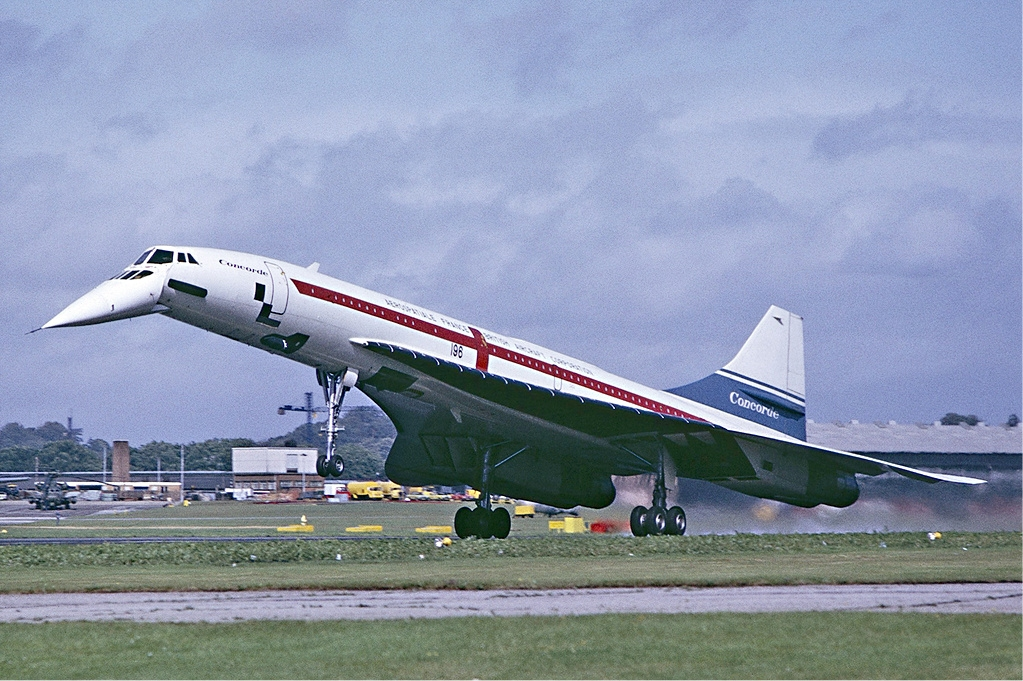
Concorde landing at Farnborough in September 1974

Concorde makes the world's first commercial passenger-carrying supersonic flight.

==== Electronics and communications ====
The birth of modern computing was in the 1970s, which saw the development of:

- Intel 4004, the world's first general microprocessor
- the C programming language
- rudimentary personal computers, with the launch of the Datapoint 2200
- pocket calculators
- the Magnavox Odyssey, the first home video game console
- the Sony Walkman, built in 1978 by Japanese audio-division engineer Nobutoshi Kihara
- consumer video games, after the release of Computer Space
- the earliest floppy disks, invented at IBM, which were 8 inches wide and long, commercially available by 1971
- email, with the first transmission in 1971
- electronic paper, developed by Nick Sheridon at Xerox's Palo Alto Research Center (PARC)
- the Xerox Alto of 1973, the first computer to use the desktop metaphor and mouse-driven graphical user interface (GUI)

The 1970s were also the start of:

- fiber optics, which transformed the communications industry
- microwave ovens, which became commercially available
- Betamax and VHS VCRs which became commercially available and especially VHS would become widely used for home entertainment in the 1980s and 1990s.
- the first voicemail system, known as the Speech Filing System (SFS), invented by Stephen J. Boies in 1973
- e-commerce, invented in 1979 by Michael Aldrich
- DiscoVision in 1978, the first commercial optical disc storage medium
- positron emission tomography, invented in 1972 by Edward J. Hoffman and fellow scientist Michael Phelps
- cell phones, with the first call transmitted in 1973, Martin Cooper of Motorola
- car phone services, first available in Finland in 1971 in form of the zero-generation ARP (Autoradiopuhelin, or Car Radiophone) service
- Microsoft was founded in 1975 by Bill Gates and Paul Allen.
- Apple Computer Company, founded in 1976 and incorporated the following year by Steve Jobs and Steve Wozniak
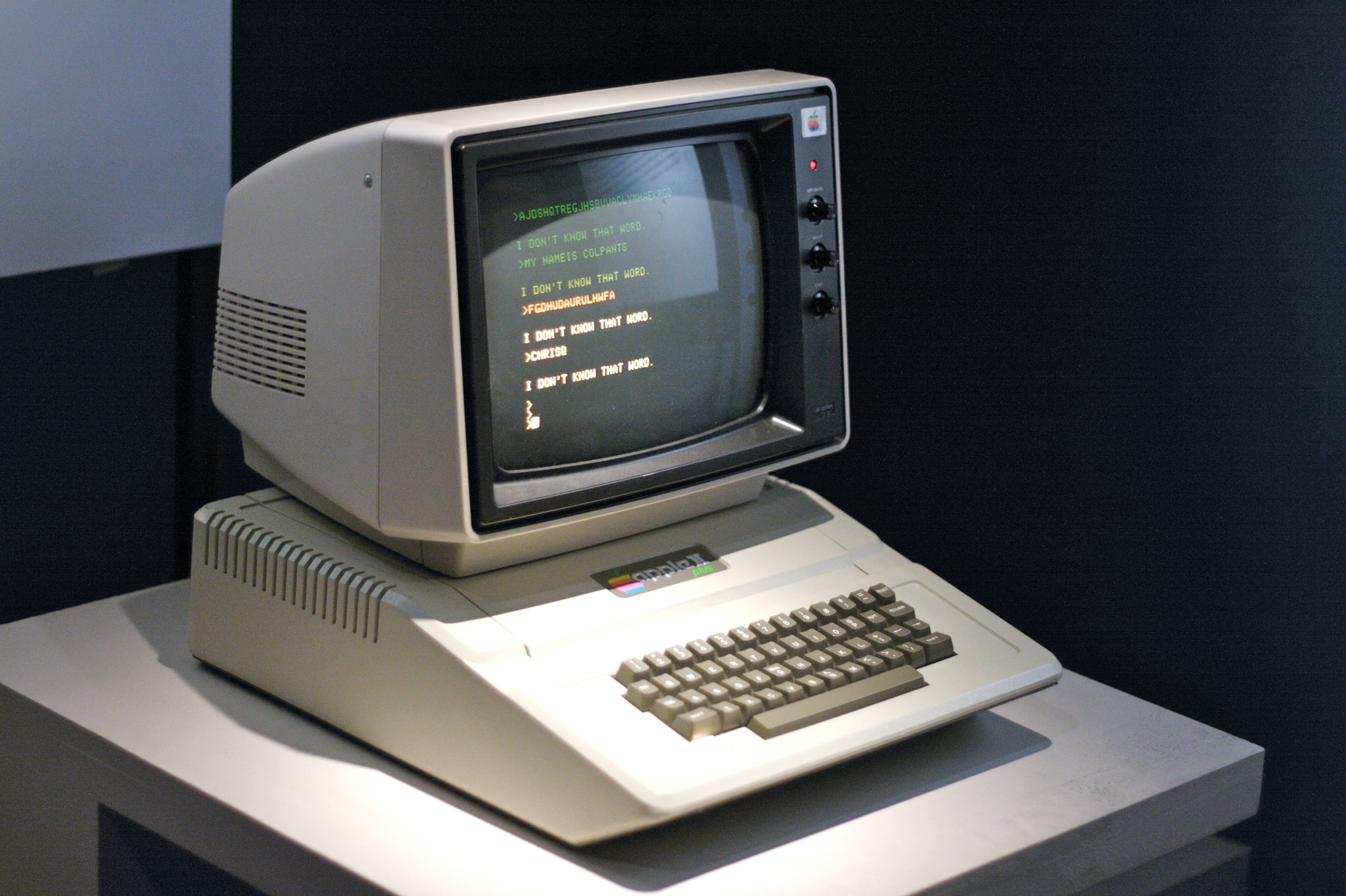
The Apple I and II Plus (pictured), invented by Steve Wozniak, helped spur the microcomputer revolution at the time.

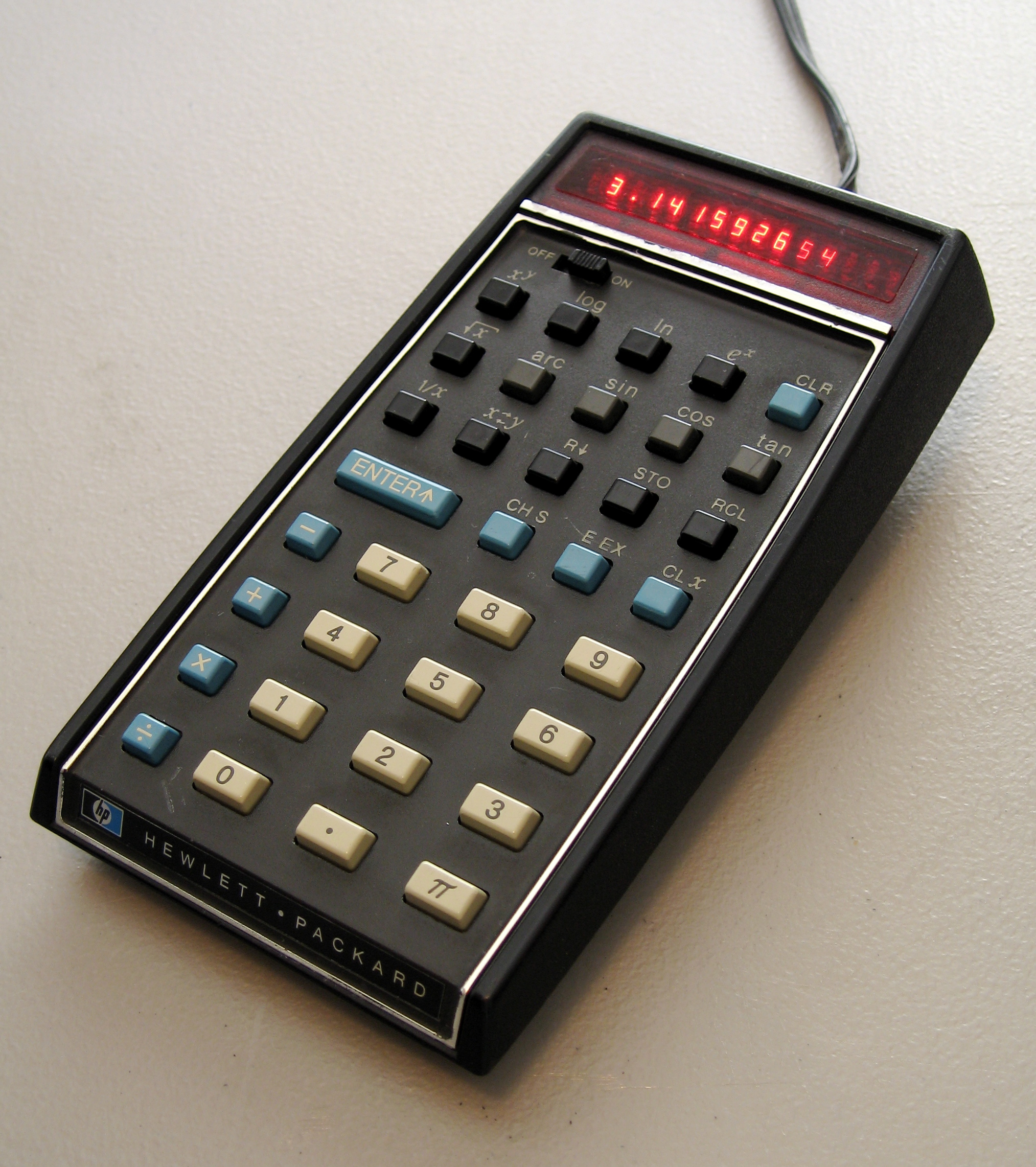
The first scientific hand-held calculator (HP-35) is introduced.

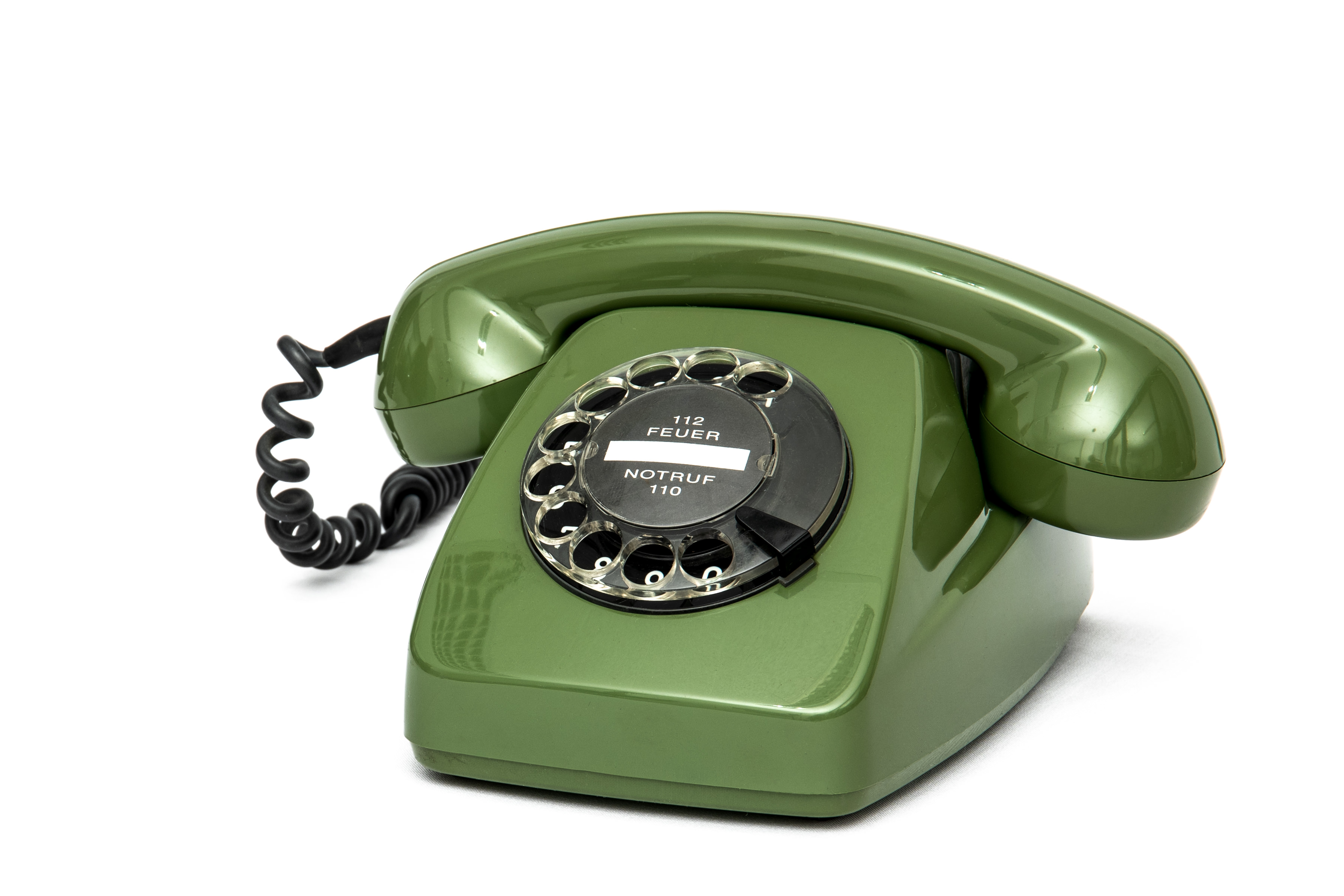
Fernsprechtischapparat (FeTAp) 611-2 Telephone

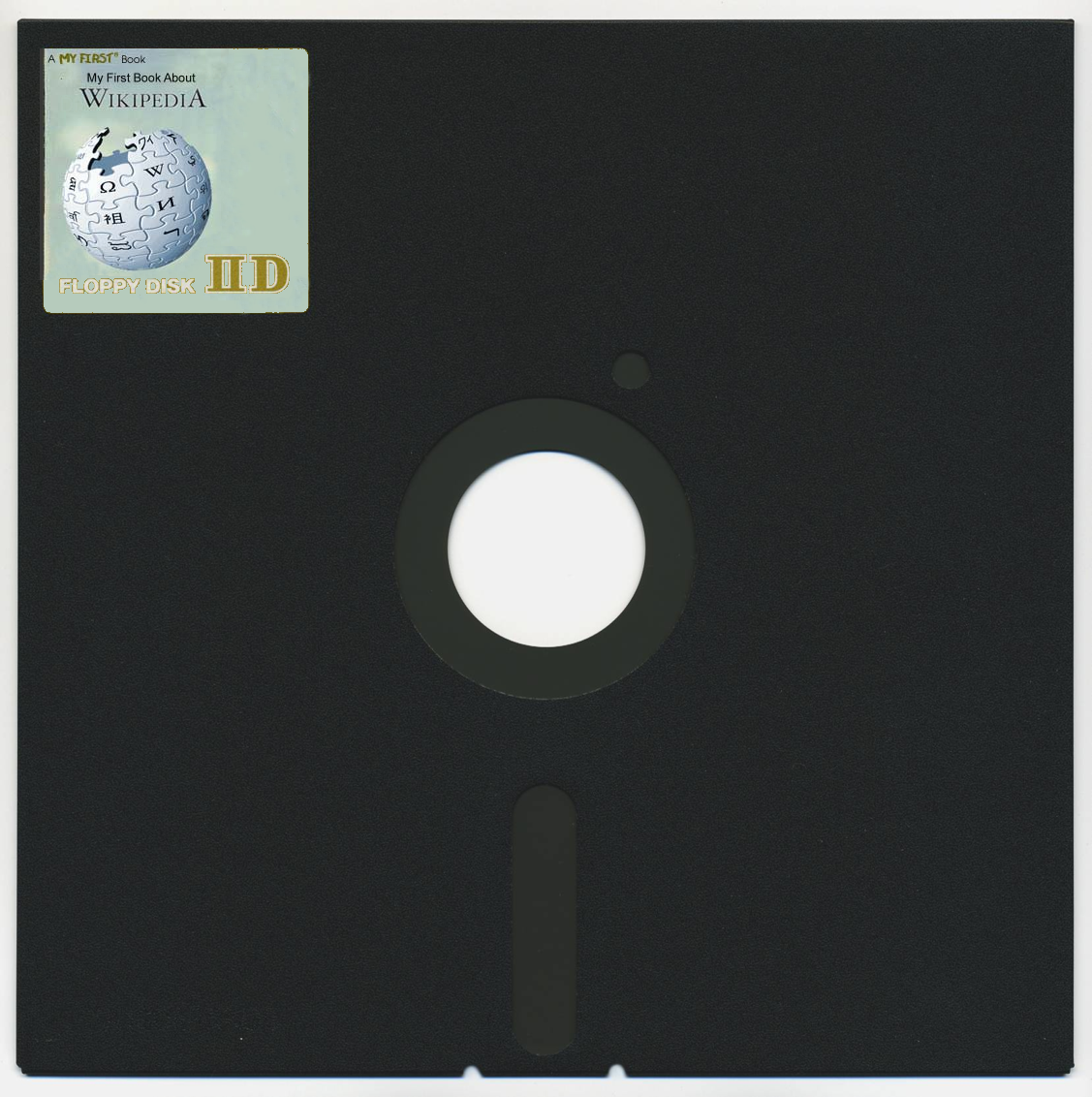
8-inch floppy disk

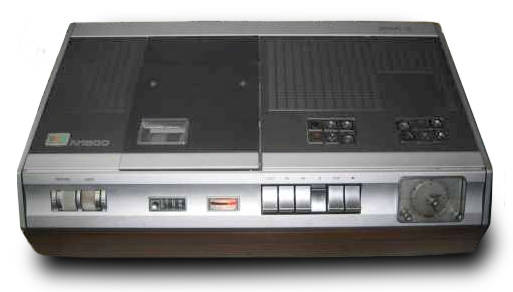
A Philips N1500 video cassette recorder, with wooden cabinet.

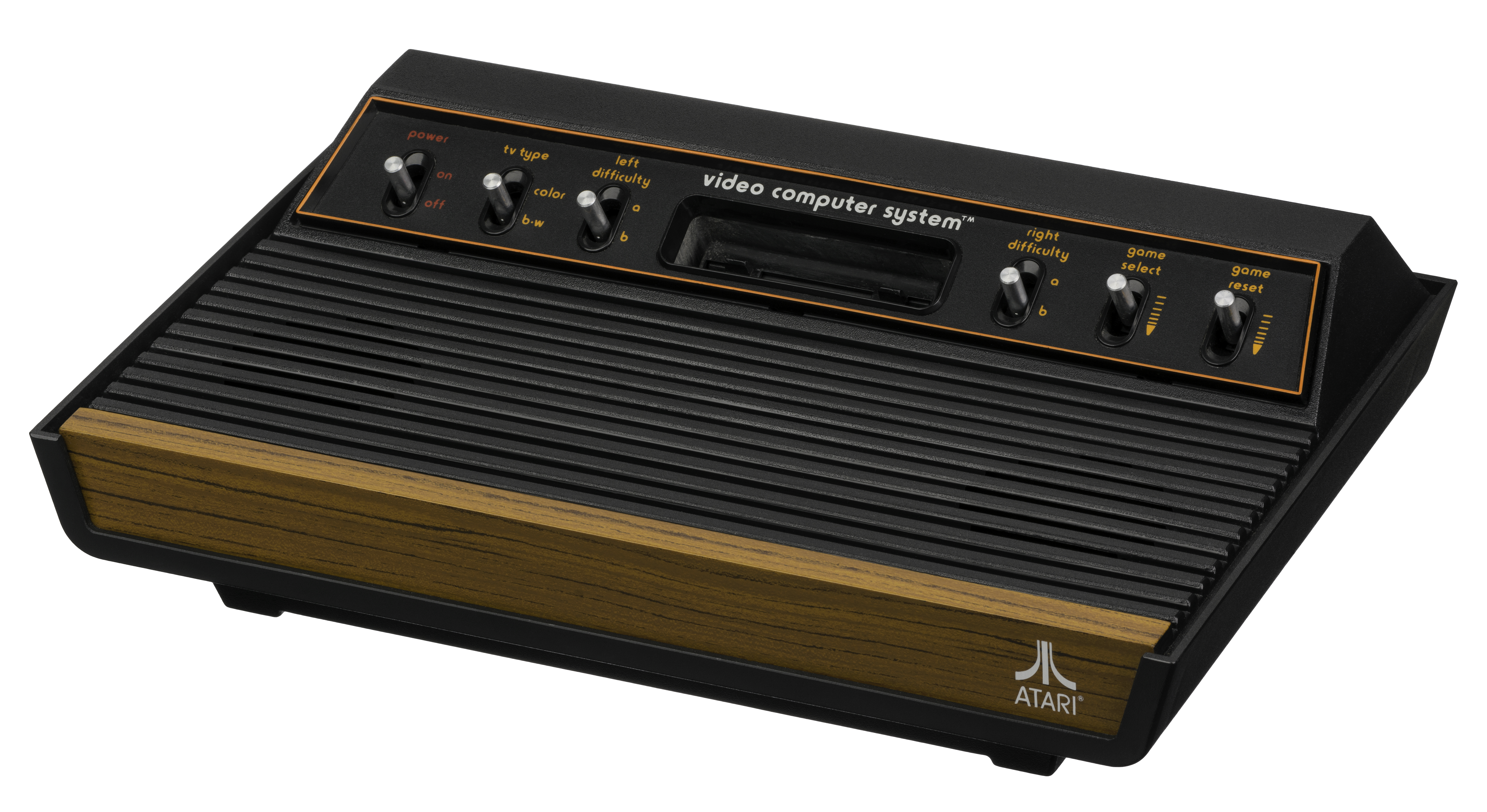
Atari 2600, launched in 1977.

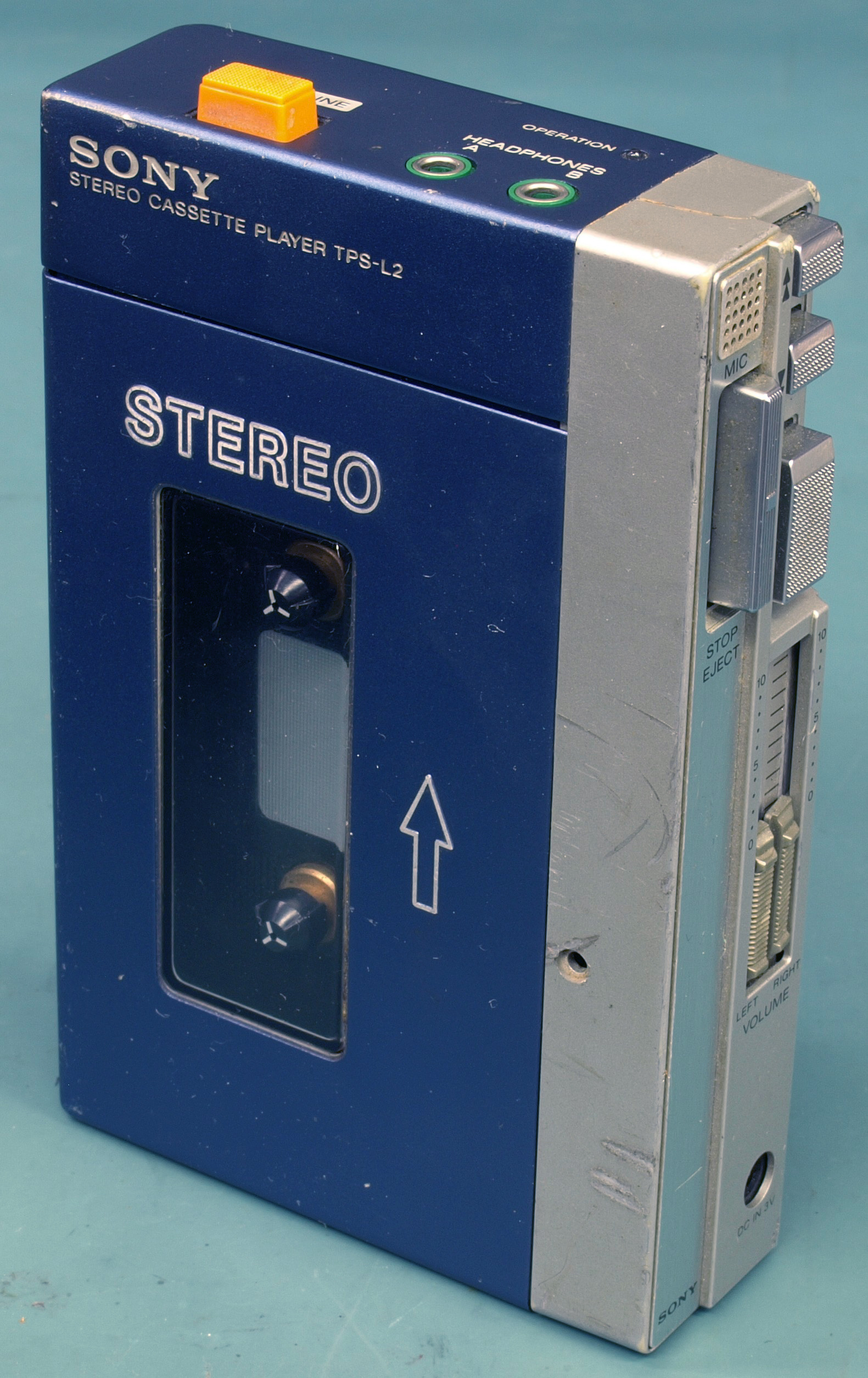
Sony Walkman, the original TPS-L2 model.

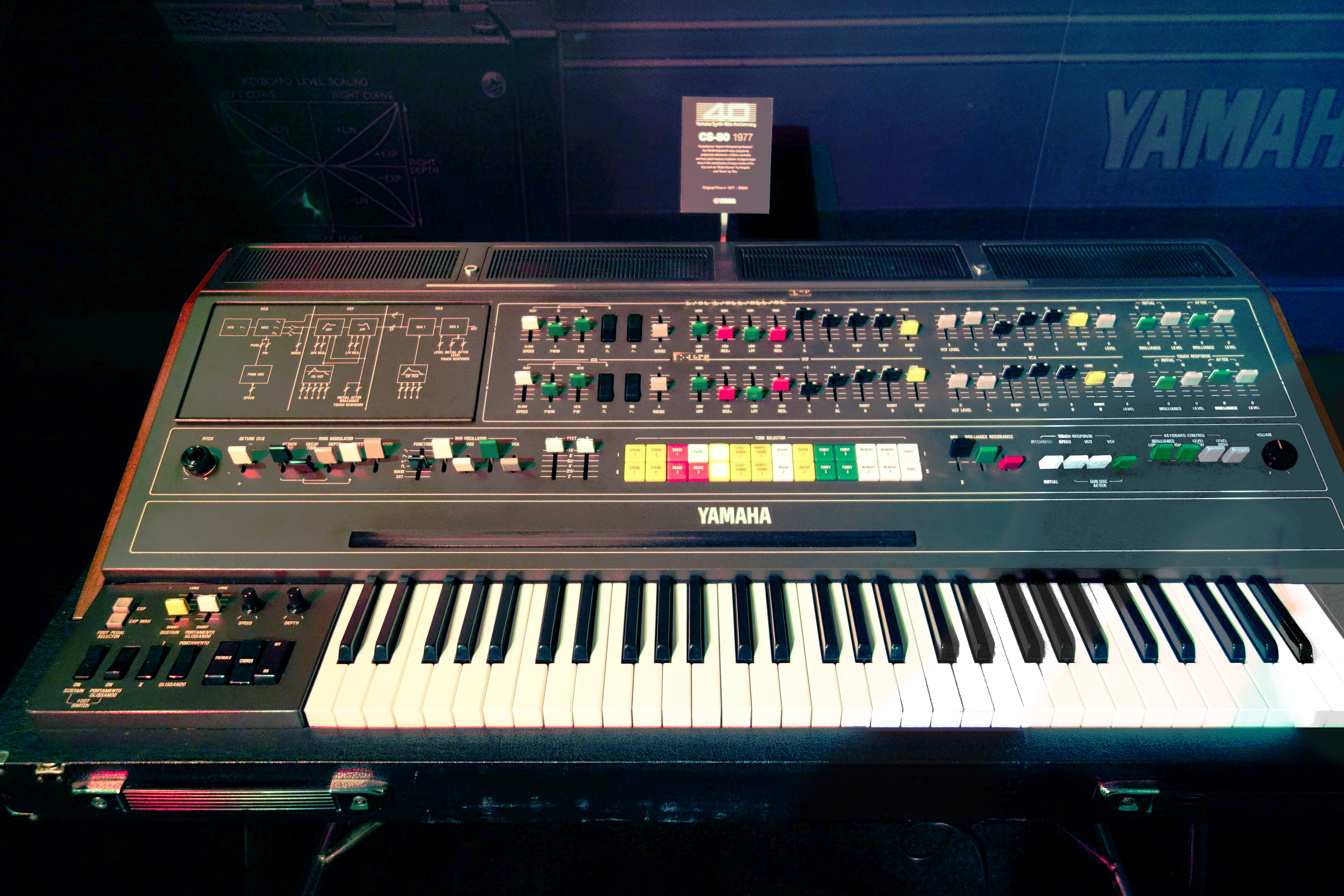
1970s analogue synthesizer Yamaha CS-80.

==== Rail ====
British Rail introduced high-speed trains on InterCity services. The trains consisted of British Rail Class 43 diesel-electric locomotives at either end with British Rail Mark 3 carriages. The trains were built in the United Kingdom by British Rail Engineering Limited. The high speed trains ran at 125 miles per hour (201 km/h) speeding up journeys between towns and cities and is still known as the InterCity 125.

Amtrak was formed in the United States in 1971, assuming responsibility for inter-city passenger operations throughout the country. In 1976, Conrail was formed to take over the assets of six bankrupt freight railroads in the northeastern US.

==== Automobiles ====
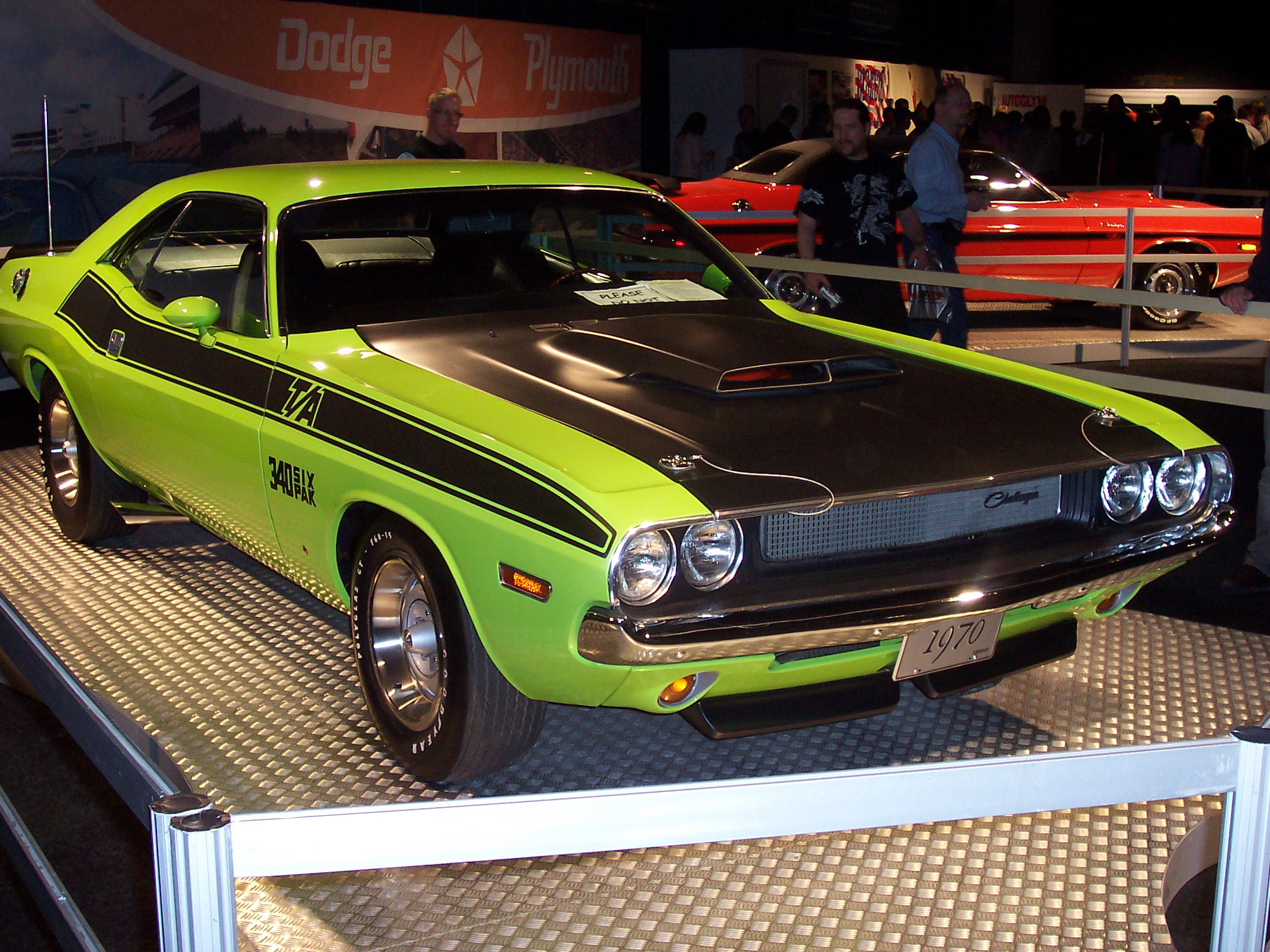
1970 Dodge Challenger Trans Am, an example of a muscle car in the earlier part of the decade.

The 1970s was an era of fuel price increases, rising insurance rates, safety concerns, and emissions controls. The 1973 oil crisis caused a move towards smaller, fuel-efficient vehicles. Attempts were made to produce electric cars, but they were largely unsuccessful. In the United States, imported cars became a significant factor for the first time, and several domestic-built subcompact models entered the market. American-made cars such as the "quirky" AMC Gremlin, the jelly bean shaped AMC Pacer, and Pontiac Firebird's powerful Trans Am "sum up" the decade. Muscle cars and convertible models faded from favor during the early-1970s. It was believed that the 1976 Cadillac Eldorado would be the last American-built convertible; ending the open body style that once dominated the auto industry.

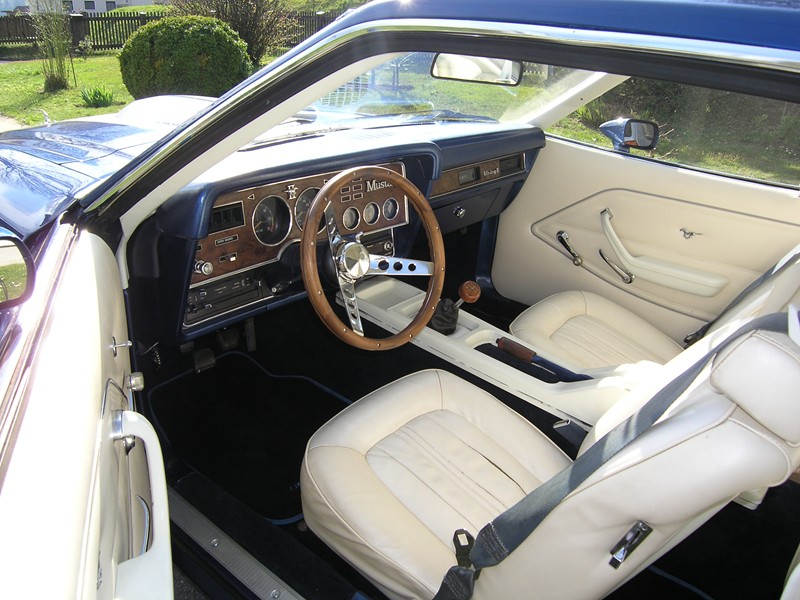
1974 Ford Mustang interior

Cars in the U.S. from the early 1970s are noted more for their power than their styling, but they even lost their power by Malaise era of the late-1970s. Styling on American cars became progressively more boxy and rectilinear during the 1970s, with coupes being the most popular body style. Wood paneling and shag carpets dominated the interiors. Many automobiles began to lose their character and looked the same across brands and automakers, as well as featuring "luxury" enhancements such as vinyl roofs and opera windows. Only a few had "real personalities" such as the AMC Gremlin, which was America's first modern subcompact, and the AMC Pacer. "These two cars embody a sense of artful desperation that made them stand out from the crowd and epitomize at once the best and worst of the seventies."

Automobiles in the U.S. reached the largest sizes they would ever attain, but by 1977, General Motors managed to downsize its full-size models to more manageable dimensions. Ford followed suit two years later, with Chrysler offering new small front-wheel-drive models, but was suffering from a worsening financial situation caused by various factors. By 1979, the company was near bankruptcy, and under its new president Lee Iacocca (who had been fired from Ford the year before), asked for a government bailout. American Motors beat out the U.S. Big Three to subcompact sized model (the Gremlin) in 1970, but its fortunes declined throughout the decade, forcing it into a partnership with the French automaker Renault in 1979.

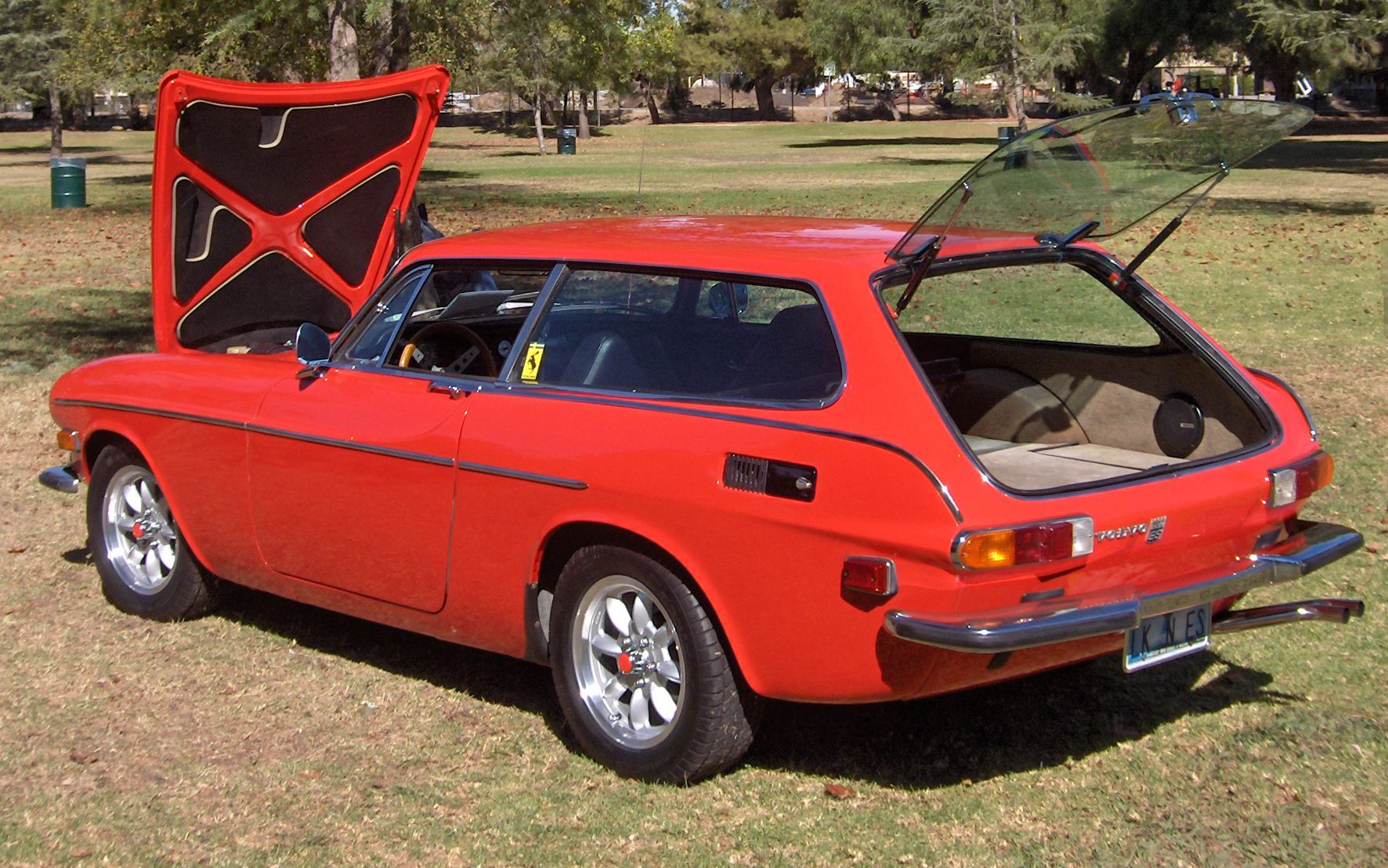
1973 Volvo P1800 sportwagon.

European car design underwent major changes during the 1970s due to the need for performance with high fuel efficiency—designs such as the Volkswagen Golf and Passat, BMW 3, 5, and 7 series, and Mercedes-Benz S-Class appeared at the latter half of the decade. Ford Europe, specifically Ford Germany, also eclipsed the profits of its American parent company. The designs of Giorgetto Giugiaro became dominant, along with those of Marcello Gandini in Italy. The 1970s also saw the decline and practical failure of the British car industry—a combination of militant strikes and poor quality control effectively halted development at British Leyland, owner of all other British car companies during the 1970s.

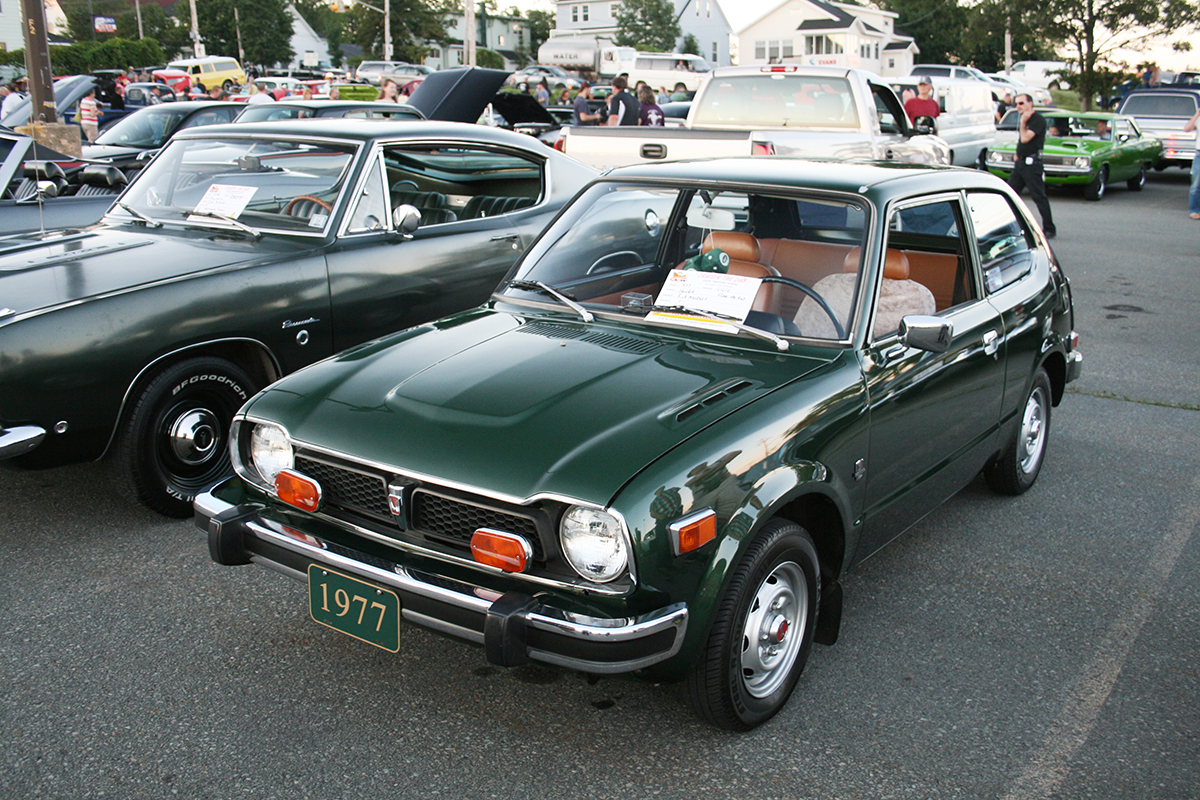
Honda Civic sold well throughout the decade.

The Japanese automobile industry flourished during the 1970s, compared to other major auto markets. Japanese vehicles became internationally renowned for their affordability, reliability, and fuel-efficiency, which was very important to many customers after the oil crisis of 1973. Japanese car manufacturing focused on computerized robotic manufacturing techniques and lean manufacturing, contributing to high-efficiency and low production costs. The Honda Civic was introduced in 1973, and sold well due to its high fuel-efficiency. By 1975 Toyota overtook Volkswagen as the top-selling imported automobile brand in the U.S., with over a million cars sold per year by this point. Other popular compact cars included the Toyota Corolla and the Datsun Sunny, in addition to other cars from those companies and others such as Subaru, Mitsubishi, and Mazda.

== Society ==
=== Role of women in society ===
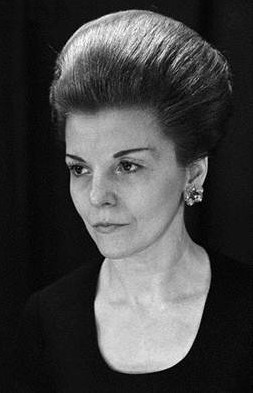
Isabel Perón becomes the first woman President of Argentina in 1974 and the first woman non-monarch head of state in the Western Hemisphere.

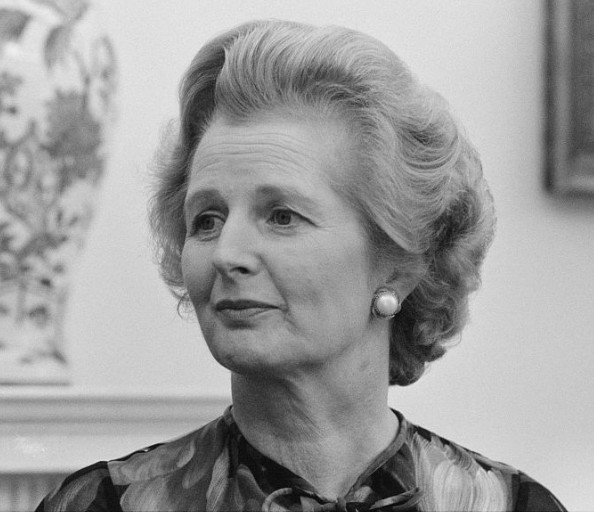
Margaret Thatcher shortly before becoming the United Kingdom's first woman Prime Minister in 1979. Thatcher's political and economic agenda began the first government committed to neoliberalism.

The role of women in society was profoundly altered with growing feminism across the world and with the presence and rise of a significant number of women as heads of state outside monarchies and heads of government in a number of countries across the world during the 1970s, many being the first women to hold such positions. Non-monarch women heads of state and heads of government in this period included Isabel Perón as the first woman president in Argentina and the first woman non-monarch head of state in the Western Hemisphere in 1974 until being deposed in 1976, Elisabeth Domitien becomes the first woman prime minister of the Central African Republic, Indira Gandhi continuing as Prime Minister of India until 1977 (and taking office again in 1980), Sirimavo Bandaranaike, Prime minister of Sri Lanka (Former Ceylon) and first female head of government in the world, re-elected in 1970, Prime Minister Golda Meir of Israel and acting chairman Soong Ching-ling of the People's Republic of China continuing their leadership from the sixties, Lidia Gueiler Tejada becoming the interim president of Bolivia beginning from 1979 to 1980, Maria de Lourdes Pintasilgo becoming the first woman prime minister of Portugal in 1979, and Margaret Thatcher becoming the first woman prime minister of the United Kingdom in 1979. Both Indira Gandhi and Margaret Thatcher would remain important political figures in the following decade in the 1980s.

Pope Paul VI recognized the popularity of Catholic feminists, but ultimately held to tradition when it came to leaving bishops, priests, and deacons a male-only position.

=== Social movements ===
==== Anti-war protests ====
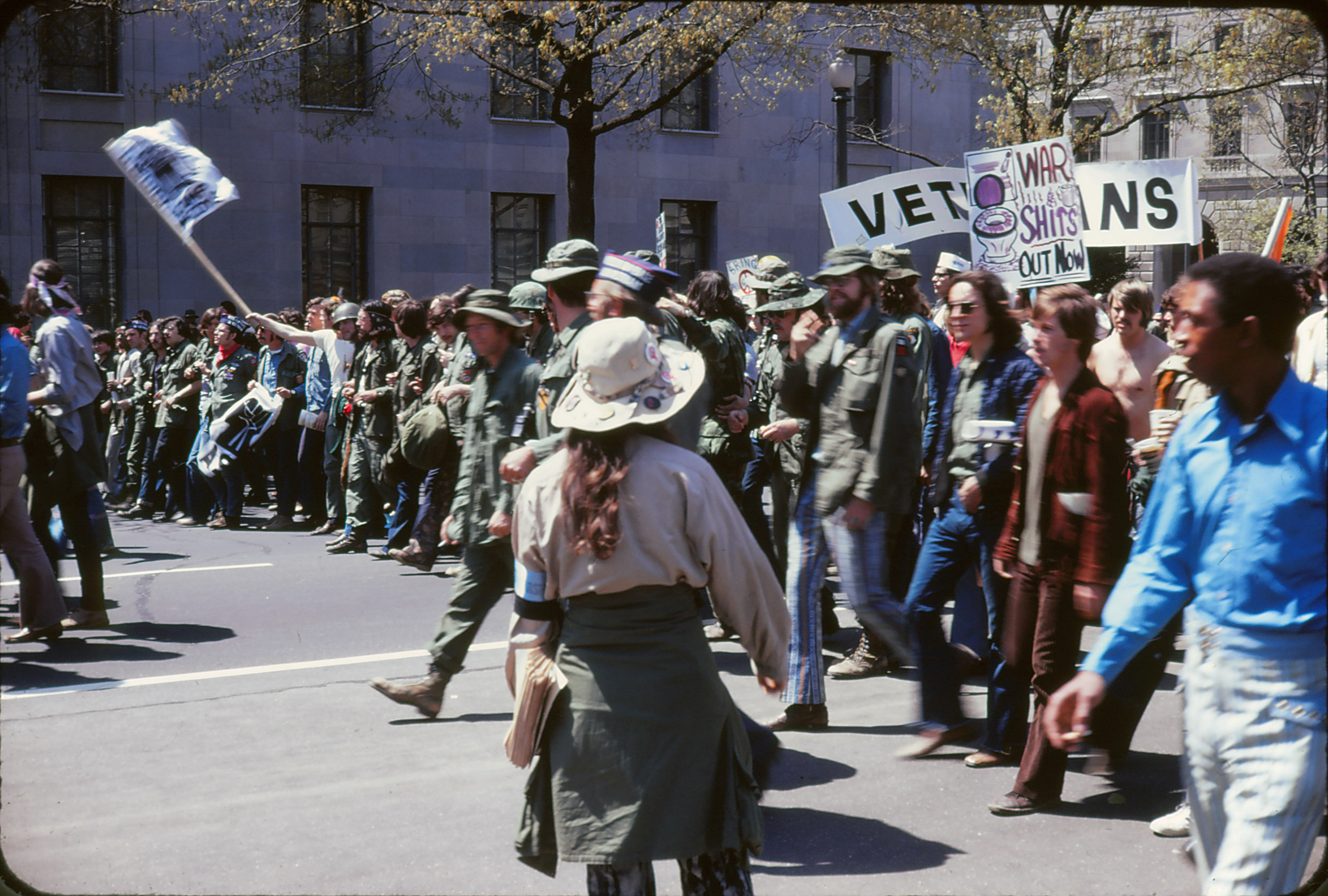
Anti-war protest against the Vietnam War in Washington, D.C., on April 24, 1971.

The opposition to the War in Vietnam that began in the 1960s grew exponentially during the early 1970s. One of the best-known anti-war demonstrations was the Kent State shootings. In 1970, university students were protesting the war and the draft. Riots ensued during the weekend and the National Guard was called in to maintain the peace. However, by 4 May 1970, tensions arose again, and as the crowd grew larger, the National Guard started shooting. Four students were killed and nine were injured. This event caused disbelief and shock throughout the country and became a staple of anti-Vietnam demonstrations.

==== Environmentalism ====
The 1970s started a mainstream affirmation of the environmental issues early activists from the 1960s, such as Rachel Carson and Murray Bookchin, had warned of. The Apollo 11 mission, which had occurred at the end of the previous decade, had transmitted back concrete images of the Earth as an integrated, life-supporting system and shaped a public willingness to preserve nature. On April 22, 1970, the United States celebrated its first Earth Day, in which over two thousand colleges and universities and roughly ten thousand primary and secondary schools participated.

==== Sexual revolution ====
The 1960s counterculture movement had rapidly undone many existing social taboos, and divorce, extramarital sex, and homosexuality were increasingly accepted in the Western world. The event of legalized abortion and over-the-counter birth control pills also played a major factor. Western Europe was in some ways more progressive on sexual liberation than the United States, as nudity in film and on TV had been gradually accepted there from the mid-1960s, and many European countries during this time began allowing women to go topless in public places. Nudist culture was also popular during the decade, especially in Germany and Scandinavia. Child erotica found a niche market, but would eventually be banned under child pornography laws in the 1980s to 1990s.

The market for adult entertainment in the 1970s was large, and driven in part by the sizable baby boomer population, and the 1972 movie Behind the Green Door, an X-rated feature, became one of the top-grossing films of the year. Playboy Magazine appeared increasingly dull and old-fashioned next to new, more explicit sex-themed magazines such as Penthouse Magazine and Hustler Magazine.

By the end of the decade, there was an increasing backlash against libertine sexual attitudes, and the event of the AIDS epidemic helped bring about an end to the Sexual Revolution. Adult movie theaters, which had exploded in numbers during the 1970s and were widely seen as a symptom of urban decay in the US, declined as pornographic movies would largely shift to VHS tapes during the succeeding decade.

==== Crime and urban decay ====
Crime rates in the US had been low from the 1940s until the mid-1960s, but began to escalate after 1965 due to a complex of social, economic, and demographic factors. By the 1970s, crime and blighted urban areas were a serious cause of concern, New York City being particularly affected. In 1972, the US Supreme Court ruled capital punishment unconstitutional, then reversed the ruling only four years later.

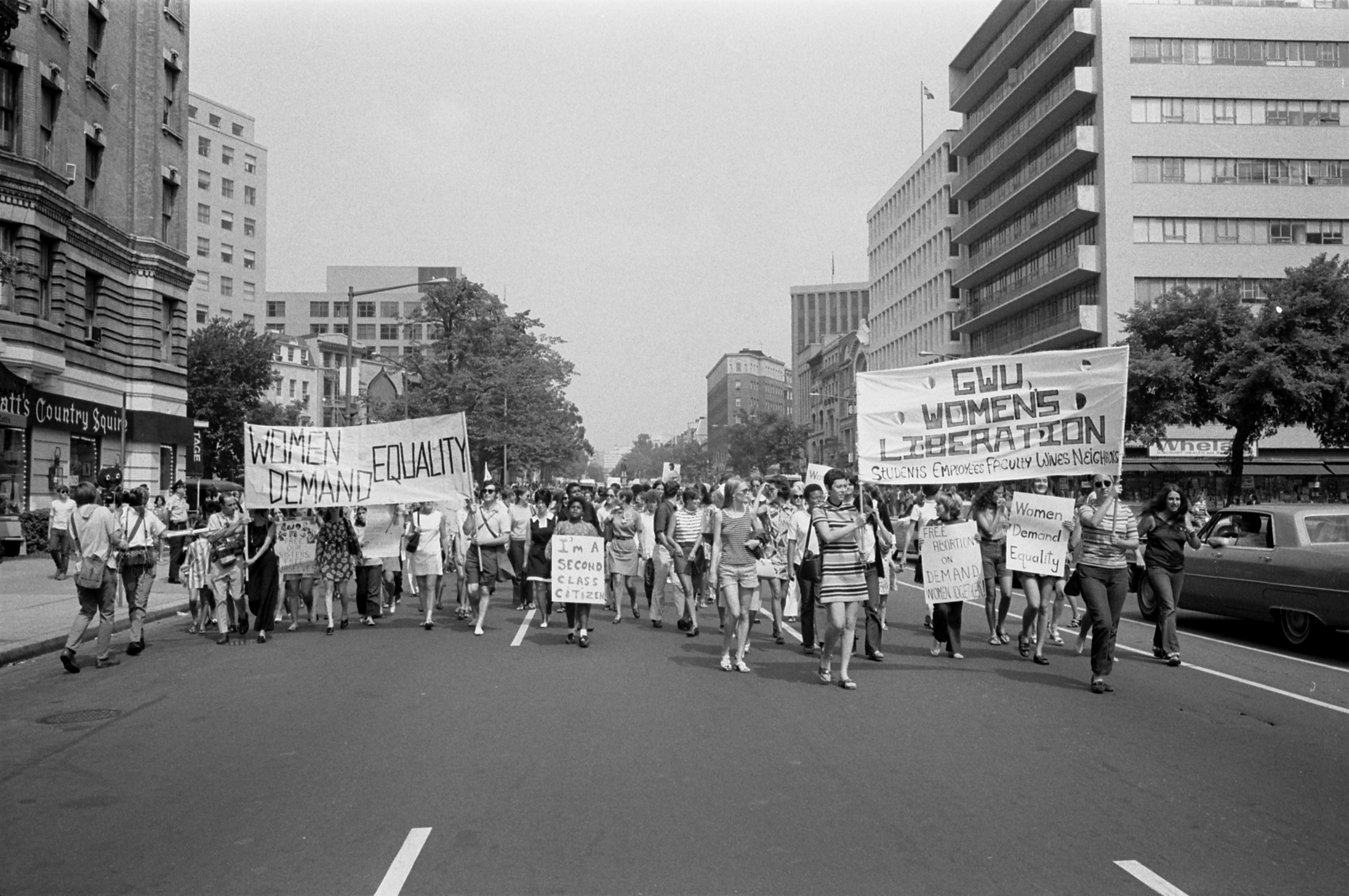
A Women's Liberation march in Washington, D.C., 1970

==== Feminism ====
The Second-Wave Feminist Movement in the United States, which had begun in the 1960s, carried over to the 1970s, and took a prominent role within society. The fiftieth anniversary of the passage of the Nineteenth Amendment to the United States Constitution (which legalized female suffrage) in 1970 was commemorated by the Women's Strike for Equality and other protests.

1971 saw Erin Pizzey establish the world's first domestic violence shelter in Chiswick, London and Pizzey and her colleagues opened further facilities throughout the next few years. This work inspired similar networks of safe houses for female victims of abuse in other countries, with the first shelter in continental Europe opening in Amsterdam in 1974.

With the anthology Sisterhood is Powerful and other works, such as Sexual Politics, being published at the start of the decade, feminism started to reach a larger audience than ever before. In addition, the Supreme Court's 1973 decision of Roe v. Wade, which constitutionalized the right to an abortion, brought the women's rights movement into the national political spotlight.

Gloria Steinem, Betty Friedan, Betty Ford, Shirley Chisholm, Bella Abzug, Robin Morgan, Kate Millett and Elizabeth Holtzman, among many others, led the movement for women's equality.

Even musically, the women's movement had its shining moment. Australian-American singer Helen Reddy, recorded the song I Am Woman, which became an anthem for the women's liberation movement. I Am Woman reached No. 1 on the Billboard Hot 100 chart and even won Helen her one and only Grammy Award.

Another movement to arise was the 1970s Goddess movement, which took place to combat patriarchal ideas of religion.

Most efforts of the movement, especially aims at social equality and repeal of the remaining oppressive, sexist laws, were successful. Doors of opportunity were more numerous and much further open than before as women gained unheard of success in business, politics, education, science, the law, and even the home. Although most aims of the movement were successful, however, there were some significant failures, most notably the failure to ratify the Equal Rights Amendment to the U.S. Constitution with only three more states needed to ratify it (efforts to ratify ERA in the unratified states continues to this day and twenty-two states have adopted state ERAs). Also, the wage gap failed to close, but it did become smaller.

The second wave feminist movement in the United States largely ended in 1982 with the failure of the Equal Rights Amendment, and with new conservative leadership in Washington, D.C.. American women created a brief, but powerful, third-wave in the early 1990s which addressed sexual harassment (inspired by the Anita Hill–Clarence Thomas Senate Judiciary Committee hearings of 1991). The results of the movement included a new awareness of such issues among women, and unprecedented numbers of women elected to public office, particularly the United States Senate.

==== Civil rights ====
The Civil Rights Movement of the 1960s began to fracture in the 1970s, as social groups began defining themselves more by their differences than by their universalities. The Black Nationalist movement grew out of frustrations with the "non-violent" strategies of earlier Civil Rights Activists. With the April 1968 assassination of Martin Luther King Jr. and June 1968 assassination of Robert F. Kennedy, many Black people were compelled to reject ideas of negotiation and instead embrace isolation. The feminist movement also splintered from a larger push for Civil Rights in the 1970s. The seventies were seen as the "woman's turn", though many feminists incorporated civil rights ideals into their movement. A feminist who had inherited the leadership position of the civil rights movement from her husband, Coretta Scott King, as leader of the black movement, called for an end to all discrimination, helping and encouraging the Woman's Liberation movement, and other movements as well. At the National Women's Conference in 1977 a minority women's resolution, promoted by King and others, passed to ensure racial equality in the movement's goals. Similarly, the gay movement made a huge step forward in the 1970s with the election of political figures such as Harvey Milk to public office and the advocating of anti-gay discrimination legislation passed and not passed during the decade. Many celebrities, including Freddie Mercury and Andy Warhol, also came out during this decade, bringing gay culture further into the limelight.

==== Youth suffrage ====
The Twenty-sixth Amendment to the United States Constitution was ratified on July 1, 1971, lowering the voting age for all federal and state elections from 21 years to 18 years. The primary impetus for this change was the fact that young men were being drafted to fight in the Vietnam War before they were old enough to vote.

== Popular culture ==
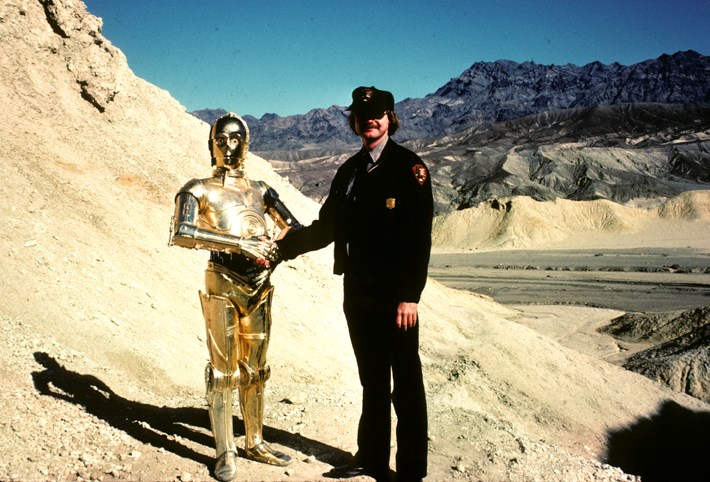
Popular films of the decade included Star Wars, Jaws, The Godfather, Alien, The Exorcist, Grease, Rocky, Chinatown, A Clockwork Orange, Superman, Apocalypse Now, Taxi Driver, The Deer Hunter, American Graffiti, and One Flew Over the Cuckoo's Nest, many of which became critical and commercial landmarks of the decade.

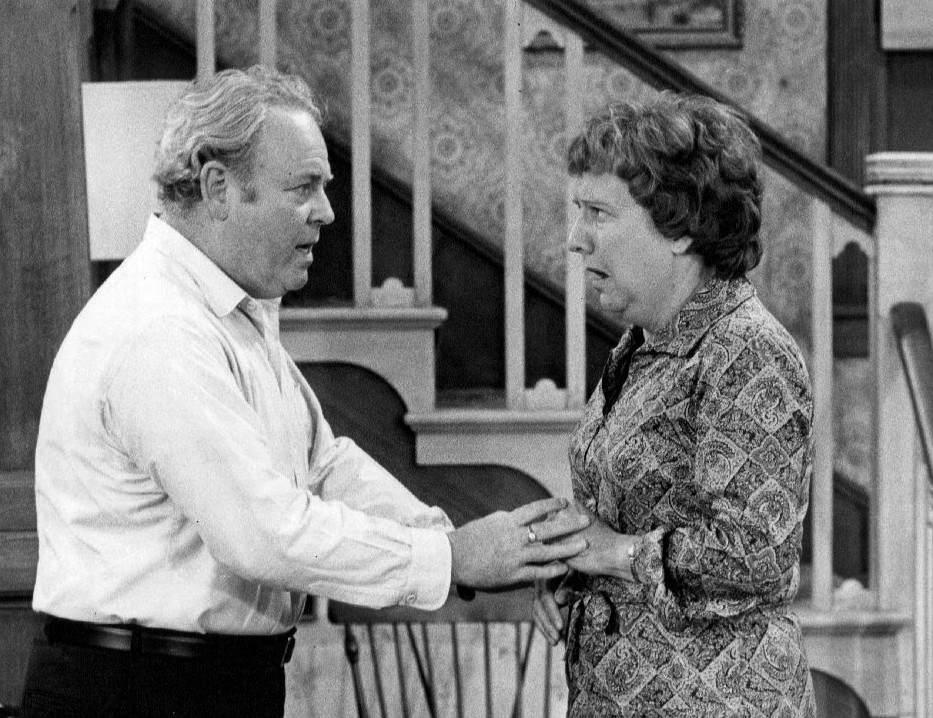
TV shows like All in the Family, The Brady Bunch, Happy Days, The Jeffersons, Good Times, M*A*S*H, The Mary Tyler Moore Show, Hawaii Five-O, Sesame Street, Welcome Back, Kotter, The Six Million Dollar Man, The Muppet Show, Charlie's Angels, Wonder Woman, Three's Company, Sanford and Son, Monty Python's Flying Circus, and Saturday Night Live, were popular in the 1970s.

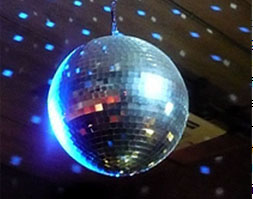
The decade saw the rise of disco culture, popularized by nightclubs and films such as Saturday Night Fever, with artists like Bee Gees, Donna Summer, and Earth, Wind & Fire dominating the charts; the genre's popularity also provoked a cultural backlash, exemplified by Disco Demolition Night in 1979.

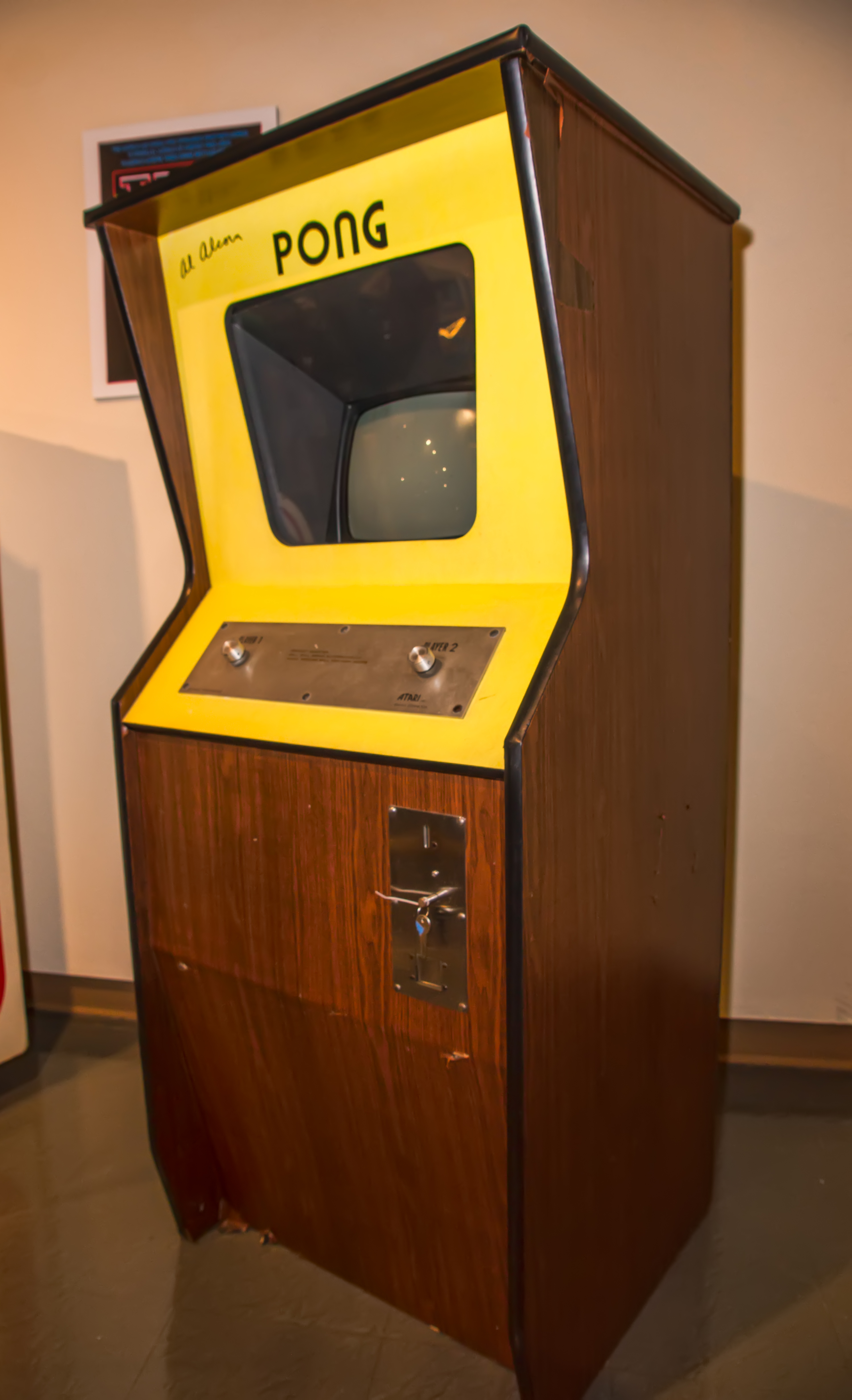
The 1970s marked the birth of video game industry, with arcade hits such as Pong, Breakout, Space Invaders, and Asteroids, alongside the rise of home consoles like the Magnavox Odyssey and the Atari 2600, which brought video gaming into households for the first time.

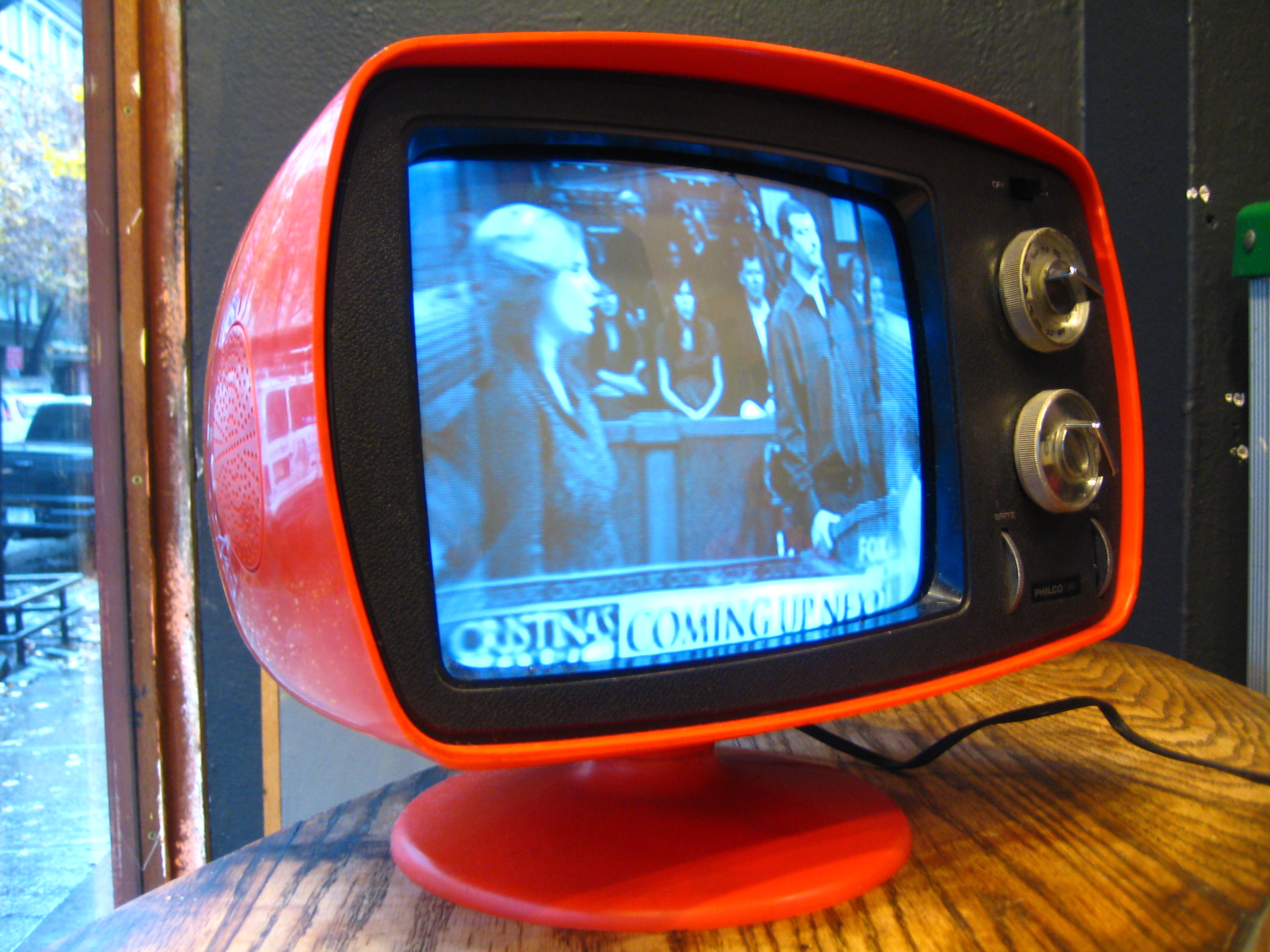
Popular animated TV shows of the 1970s included Scooby-Doo, Where are You!, Schoolhouse Rock!, Josie and the Pussycats, The Addams Family, Fat Albert and the Cosby Kids, Hong Kong Phooey, Star Trek, Super Friends, Jabberjaw, and Captain Caveman and the Teen Angels.

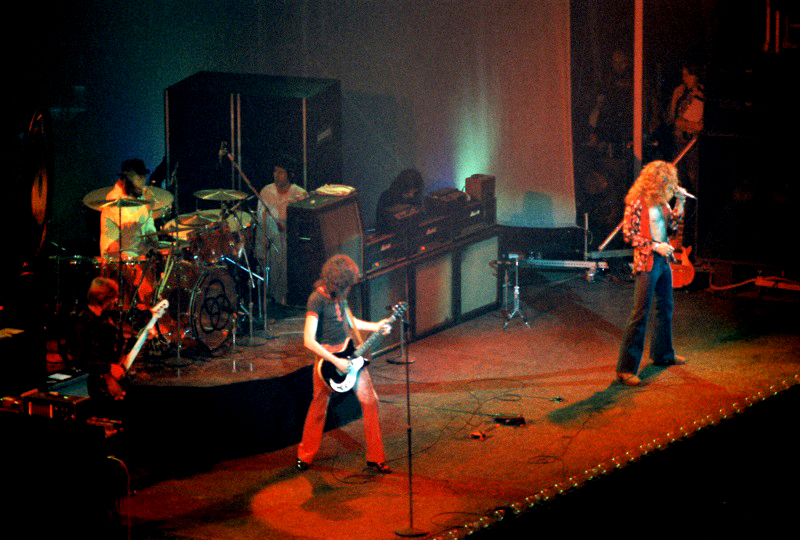
Hard rock, heavy metal, and progressive rock, rose in the 1970s, with bands such as Pink Floyd, Led Zeppelin, Black Sabbath, Deep Purple, Kiss, Supertramp, and Yes, achieving widespread popularity and helping define the sound and image of rock music during the decade.

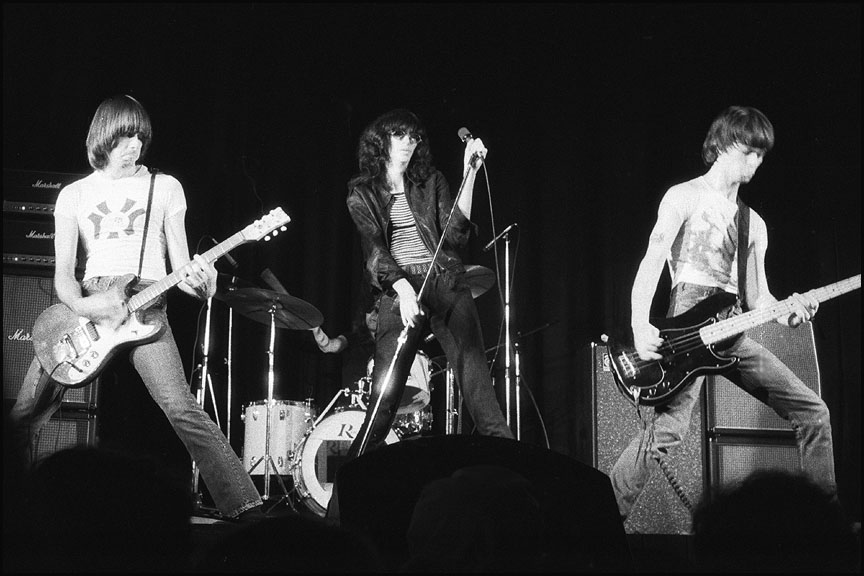
The late 1970s saw the rise of punk rock, with bands such as Ramones, Sex Pistols, and The Clash emerging from New York and London and influencing fashion, youth culture, and the sound of popular music.

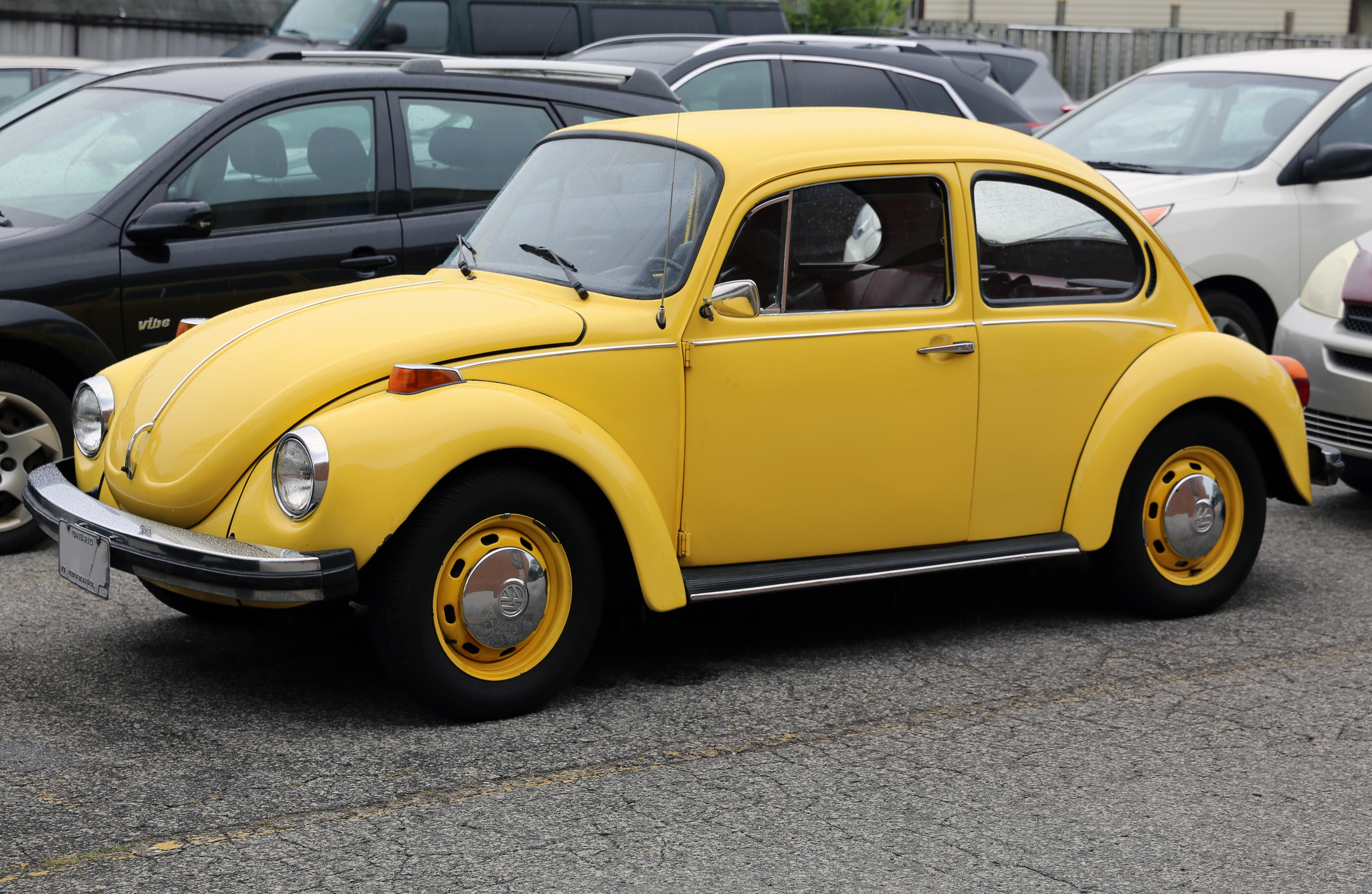
The Volkswagen Beetle and Toyota Corolla line of cars were popular in the 1970s, making the world's best-selling automobiles at the time.

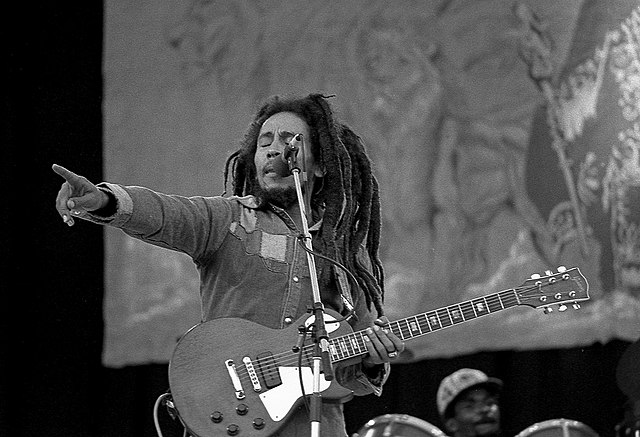
Reggae music rose to worldwide prominence in the 1970s, led by artists such as Bob Marley, Peter Tosh, and Jimmy Cliff, spreading Jamaican musical styles and Rastafari culture internationally.

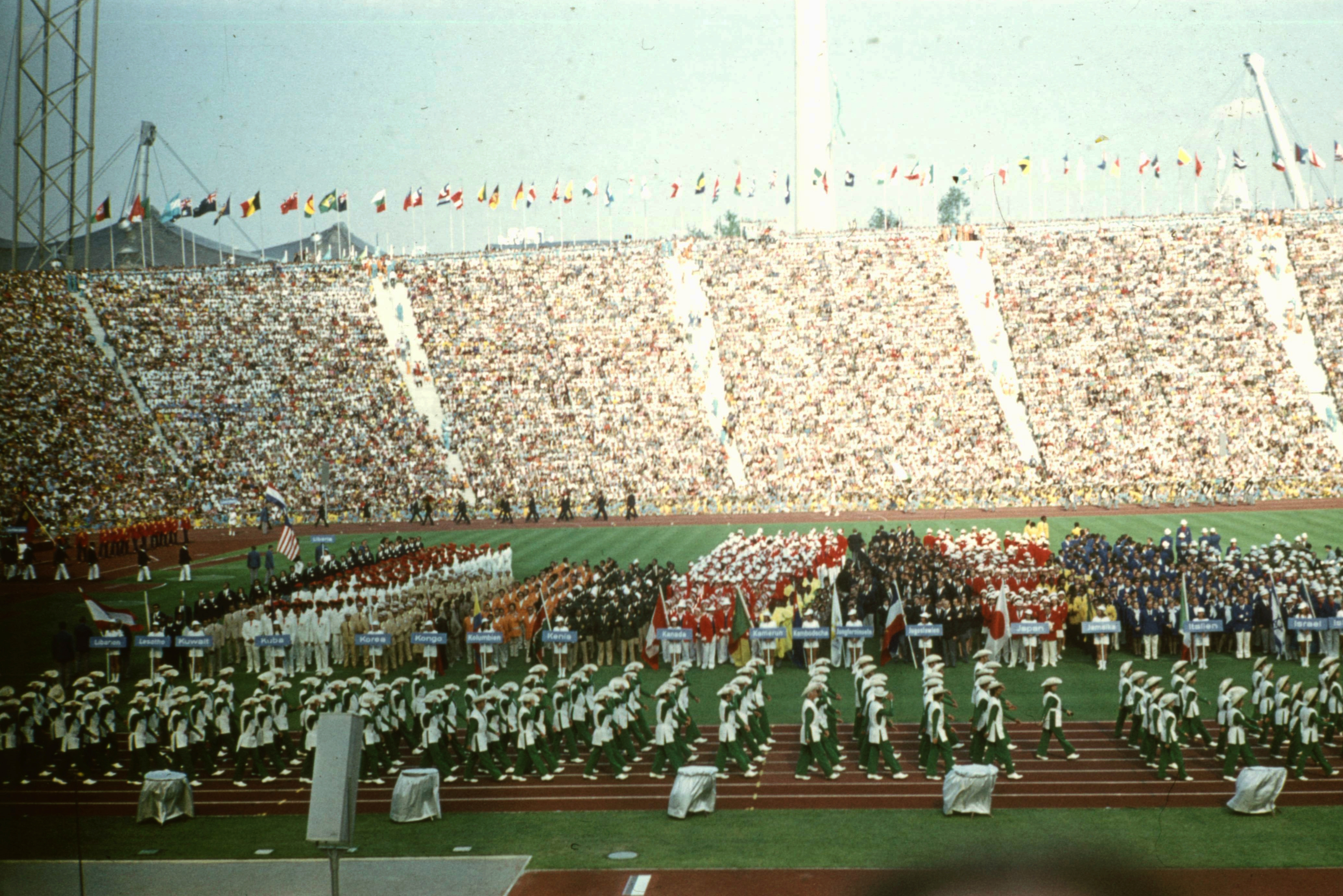
Four Olympic Games were held in the 1970s, Sapporo and Munich in 1972, Innsbruck and Montreal in 1976, all during the Cold War, and prompting significant events like the Munich massacre in 1972 and the African-led boycott in 1976.

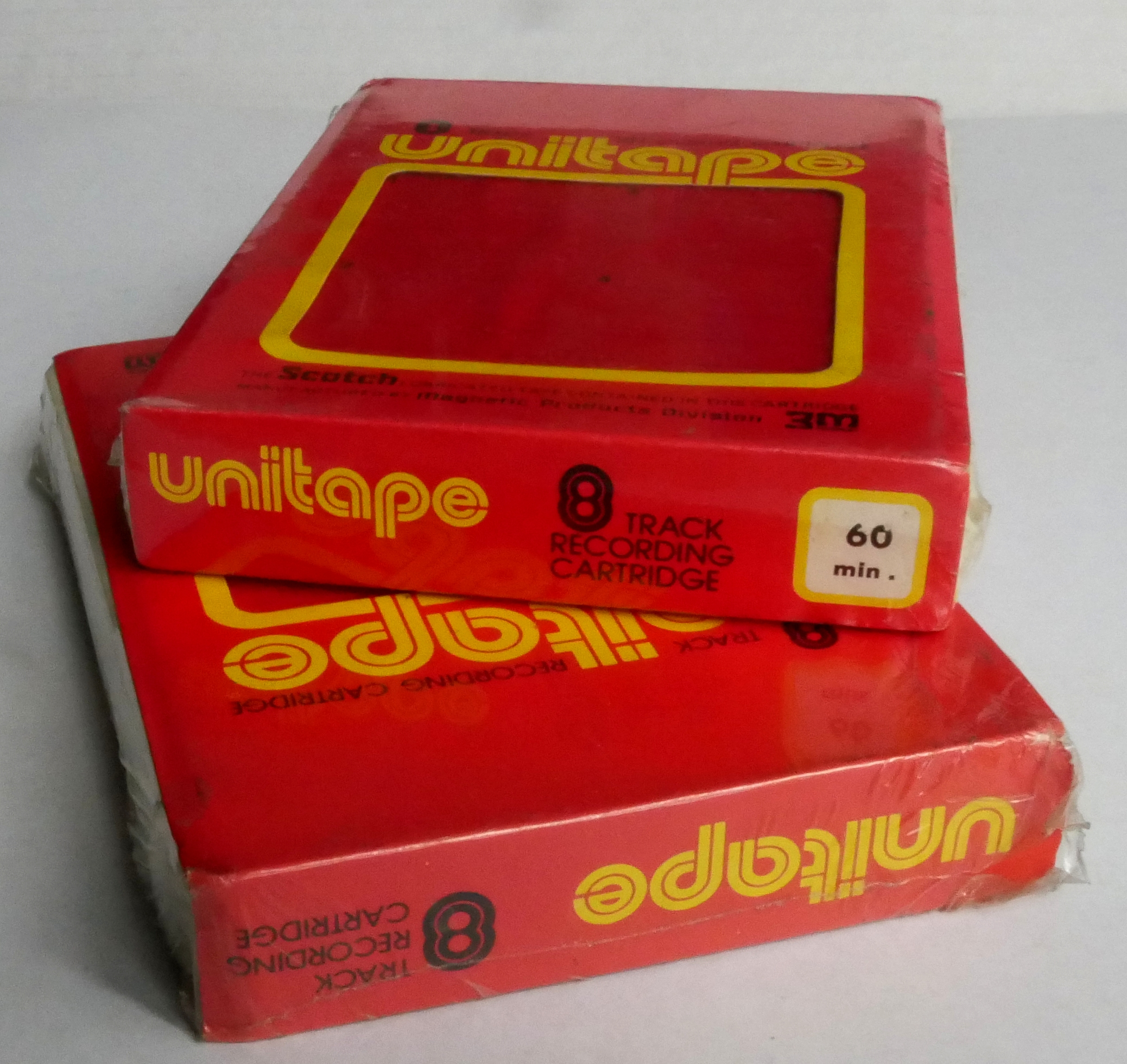
8-track cartridges were a popular music format in the 1970s, widely used in car stereos and home audio systems, and became a defining part of how people experienced music during the decade.

=== Music ===
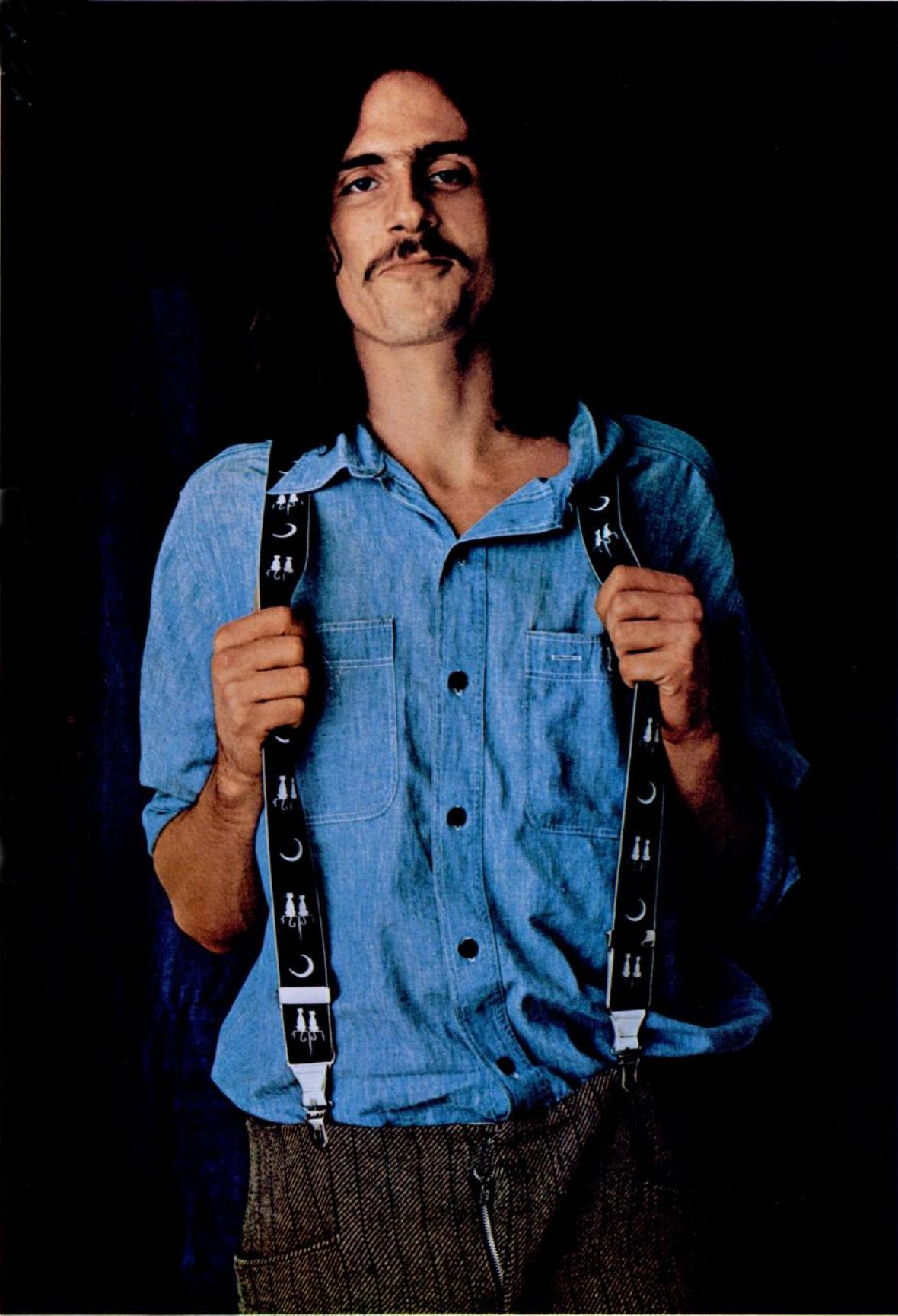
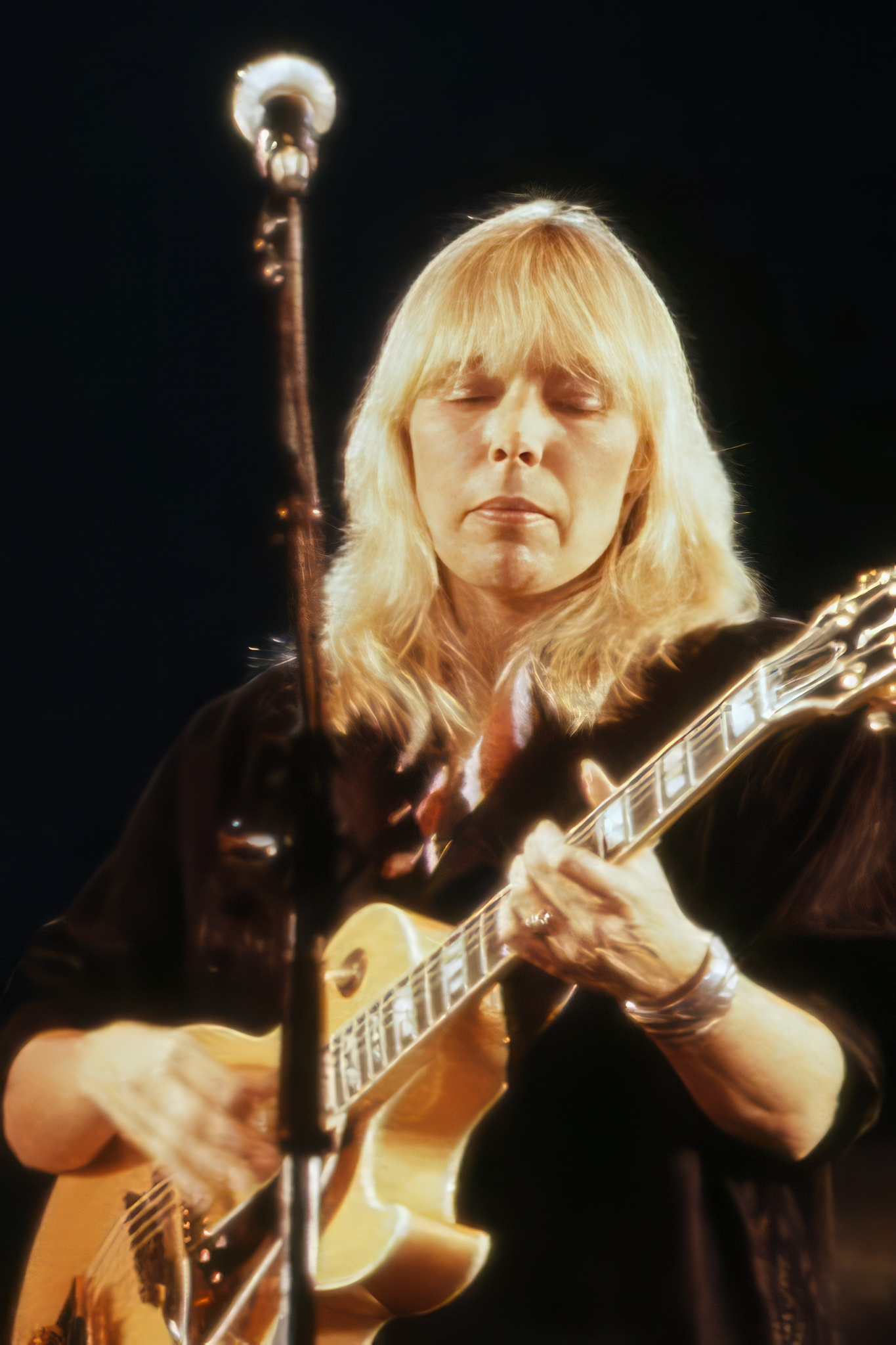
James Taylor (left) and Joni Mitchell (right) were two of the most influential and successful contemporary folk musicians of the decade, along with artists like Cat Stevens, John Denver, Gordon Lightfoot, Neil Young and others.

During the early 1970s, popular music continued to be dominated by musicians who had achieved fame during the 1950s and the 1960s such as the Rolling Stones, The Who, Elvis Presley, Johnny Cash, Loretta Lynn, Conway Twitty, Bob Dylan, The Grateful Dead, and Eric Clapton. In addition, many newcomer rock groups such as Black Sabbath and Led Zeppelin appeared. The Beatles disbanded in 1970, but each member of the band immediately released a highly successful solo album, and Paul McCartney especially would remain extremely popular throughout the decade. Singer-songwriters such as Elton John, James Taylor and Jackson Browne also came into vogue during the early 1970s.

The 1970s saw the rapid commercialization of rock music, and by the mid-decade there were a spate of bands derisively dubbed "corporate rock" due to the notion that they had been created by record labels to produce simplistic, radio-friendly songs that offered clichés rather than meaningful lyrics. Such bands included The Doobie Brothers, Bread, Styx, Kansas, and REO Speedwagon.

Funk, an offshoot of soul music with a greater emphasis on beats, and influences from rhythm and blues, jazz, and psychedelic rock, was also very popular. The mid-1970s also saw the rise of disco music, which dominated during the last half of the decade with bands like the Bee Gees, Chic, ABBA, Village People, Boney M, Donna Summer, KC and the Sunshine Band, and others. In response to this, rock music became increasingly hard-edged, with early metal artists like Led Zeppelin, Jimi Hendrix, Black Sabbath, and Deep Purple. Minimalism also emerged, led by composers such as Philip Glass, Steve Reich and Michael Nyman. This was a break from the intellectual serial music in the tradition of Schoenberg, which lasted from the early 1900s to the 1960s.

The 1970s also saw artists from Motown records become popular across the globe. Artists like the Jackson 5, Stevie Wonder and Marvin Gaye dominated the record charts across the world and had a significant influence on pop culture, including breaking down racial barriers.

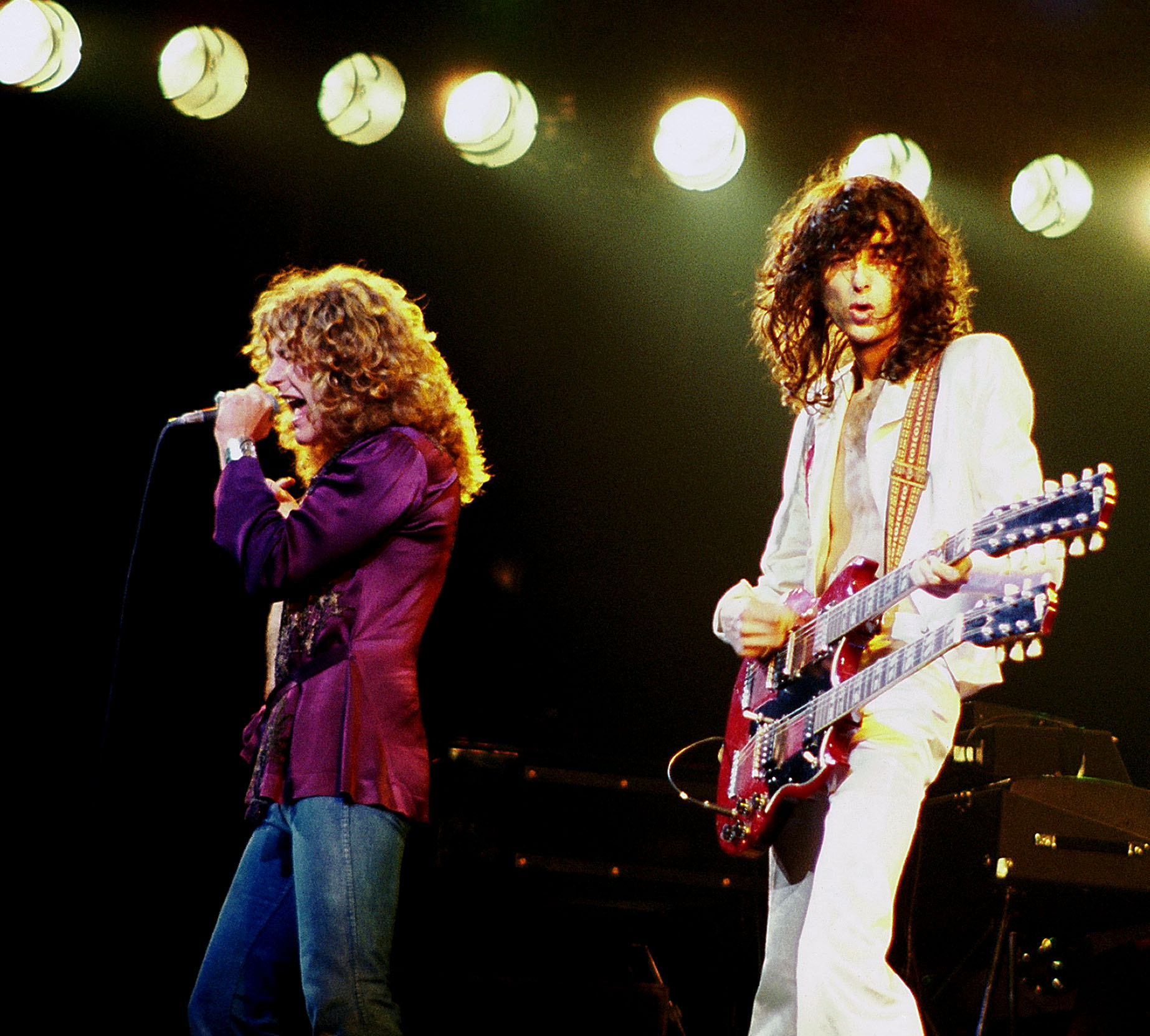
British rock band Led Zeppelin was one of the most popular and influential bands of the 1970s. The band's heavy, guitar-driven sound has led them to be cited as one of the progenitors of heavy metal.

Classical and experimental music influenced both art rock and progressive rock genres with bands such as Pink Floyd, Yes, Todd Rundgren's Utopia, Supertramp, Rush, Genesis, King Crimson, Emerson, Lake & Palmer, Jethro Tull, The Moody Blues and Soft Machine. Hard rock and heavy metal also emerged among British bands Led Zeppelin, Queen, The Who, Black Sabbath, UFO, Deep Purple, Uriah Heep, and Judas Priest. Australian band AC/DC also found its hard-rock origins in the early 1970s and its breakthrough in 1979's Highway to Hell, while popular American rock bands included Aerosmith, Journey, Lynyrd Skynyrd and shock rockers Alice Cooper, Blue Öyster Cult, and Kiss, and guitar-oriented Ted Nugent and Van Halen. In Europe, there was a surge of popularity in the early decade for glam rock.

After a successful return to live performing in the late 60s with his TV special, Elvis Presley regained his popularity through Vegas performance engagements and concert tours throughout the United States until his death in 1977, which helped him acquire a new generation of fans. His 1973 televised concert, Aloha from Hawaii Via Satellite, aired in over 40 countries in Europe and Asia, as well as the United States, making it one of the most popular concert events of the decade.

The second half of the decade saw the rise of punk rock, when a spate of fresh, young rock groups playing stripped-down hard rock came to prominence at a time when most of the artists associated with the 1960s to early 1970s were in creative decline. Punk bands included The Sex Pistols, The Clash, The Ramones, Talking Heads, and more.

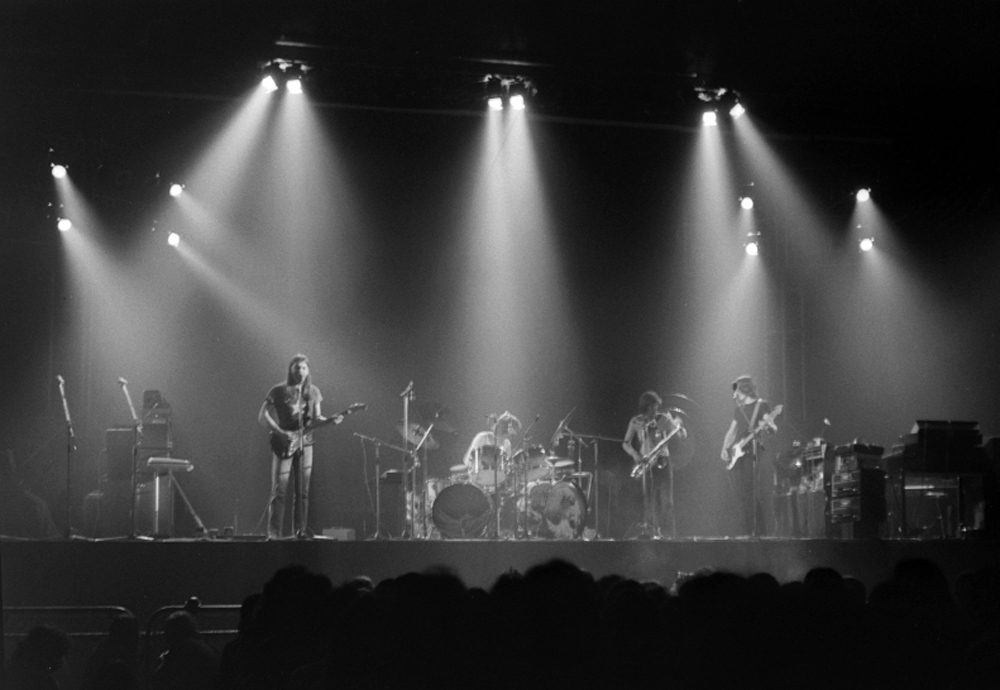
Pink Floyd performing The Dark Side of the Moon in 1973, the highest-selling album of the decade and one of the highest-selling of all time.

The highest-selling album of the decade was Pink Floyd's The Dark Side of the Moon (1973), along with Eagles' Hotel California (1976) and Fleetwood Mac's Rumours (1977). Dark Side of the Moon remained on the Billboard 200 albums chart for 741 weeks. Electronic instrumental progressive rock was particularly significant in continental Europe, allowing bands like Kraftwerk, Tangerine Dream, Can, and Faust to circumvent the language barrier. Their synthesiser-heavy krautrock, along with the work of Brian Eno (for a time the keyboard player with Roxy Music), would be a major influence on subsequent synthrock. The mid-1970s saw the rise of electronic art music musicians such as Jean-Michel Jarre, Vangelis, and Tomita, who with Brian Eno were a significant influence of the development of new-age music. Japanese band Yellow Magic Orchestra helped to pioneer synthpop, with their self-titled album (in 1978) setting a template with less minimalism and with a strong emphasis on melody, and drawing from a wider range of influences than had been employed by Kraftwerk. YMO also introduced the microprocessor-based Roland MC-8 sequencer and TR-808 rhythm machine to popular music.

In the first half of the 1970s, many jazz musicians from the Miles Davis school achieved cross-over success through jazz-rock fusion with bands like Weather Report, Return to Forever, The Headhunters and The Mahavishnu Orchestra who also influenced this genre and many others. In Germany, Manfred Eicher started the ECM label, which quickly made a name for "chamber jazz". Towards the end of the decade, Jamaican reggae music, already popular in the Caribbean and Africa since the early 1970s, became very popular in the U.S. and in Europe, mostly because of reggae superstar and legend Bob Marley. The mid-1970s saw the reemergence of acoustic jazz with the return of artists like Dexter Gordon to the US music scene, who, along with a number of other artists, such as trumpet innovators like Don Ellis and Woody Shaw, who were among the last of the decade's traditionally oriented acoustic jazz musicians to be signed to major record labels, to receive critical and widespread commercial recognition and multiple Grammy nominations.

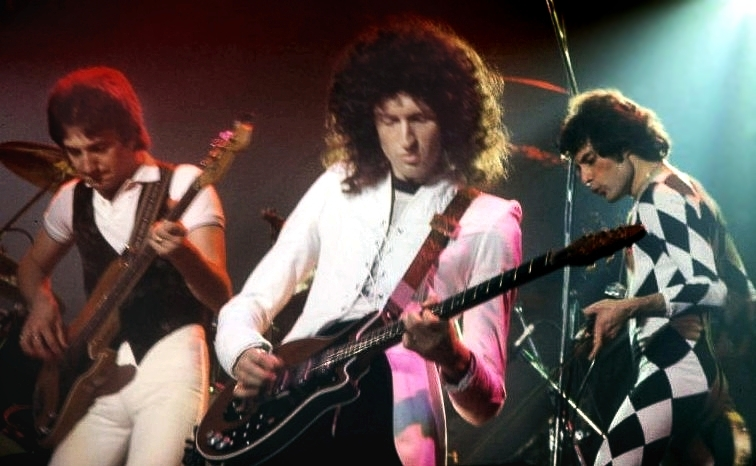
British rock band Queen (pictured here in 1977) was considered to be one of the most influential bands of the '70s (as well as the '80s), along with American rock band Eagles and others

The late 1970s also saw the beginning of hip-hop with disc jockeys like DJ Kool Herc and Afrika Bambaataa taking loops from funk and soul records and playing them repeatedly at block parties and dance clubs. At the end of the 1970s, popular songs like Rapper's Delight by Sugarhill Gang gave hip-hop a wider audience. Hip-hop was also influenced by the song The Revolution Will Not Be Televised by Gil Scott-Heron.

Country music also continued to increase in popularity in the 1970s. Between 1977 and 1979, it became more mainstream, particularly with the outlaw movement, led by Waylon Jennings and Willie Nelson. The 70s also saw the rise of a country music subgenre, southern rock, led by the Allman Brothers Band. Other artists; such as Conway Twitty, Loretta Lynn, Don Williams, Kenny Rogers, Dolly Parton, Ronnie Milsap, Crystal Gayle, and Barbara Mandrell; all scored hits throughout the 70s which reached both country and pop charts. The genre also saw its golden age of vocal duos and groups in this decade; with Conway Twitty and Loretta Lynn, George Jones and Tammy Wynette, Jim Ed Brown and Helen Cornelius, the Bellamy Brothers, the Oak Ridge Boys, the Statler Brothers, Dave & Sugar, and The Kendalls. The genre also became more involved in Hollywood toward the end of the decade, with country-themed action films such as Smokey and the Bandit and Every Which Way But Loose, a trend that continued into the early 80s with Urban Cowboy and Bronco Billy.

A major event in music in the early 1970s was the deaths of popular rock stars Jimi Hendrix, Janis Joplin, and Jim Morrison, all at the age of 27. Two of popular music's most successful artists from other eras died within eight weeks of each other in 1977. Elvis Presley, the best-selling singer of all time, died on August 16, 1977. Presley's funeral was held at Graceland, on Thursday, August 18, 1977. Bing Crosby, who sold about 50 million records, died on October 14, 1977. His single, White Christmas, remains the best-selling single of all time, confirmed by the Guinness Records.

In addition to the deaths in the 1970s, breakups of bands and duos; such as the Beatles, Simon and Garfunkel, Creedence Clearwater Revival, the Everly Brothers, and others; occurred over the course of the decade.

Statistically, Led Zeppelin and Elton John were the most successful musical acts of the 1970s, both having sold more than 300 million records since 1969.

During the 1970s, Japan had the second-largest music market in the world. Popular music included kayōkyoku, idols, new music, rock and enka. Musical artists and bands included Momoe Yamaguchi, Saori Minami, the Candies, Pink Lady, Hiromi Go, Hideki Saijo, Yuming, Saki Kubota, Judy Ongg and Sachiko Kobayashi.

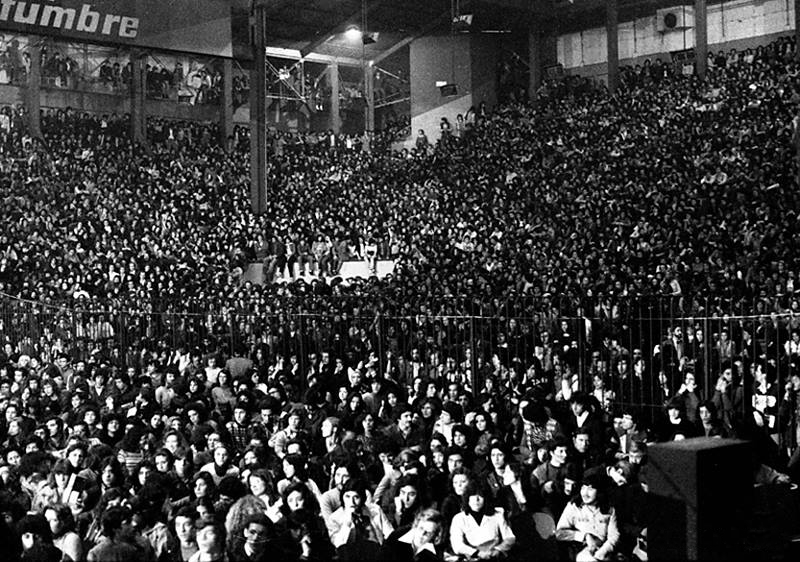
Public at the farewell concert of Sui Generis (1975)

Argentine rock became the most popular musical genre in Argentina among youngsters, and became famous throughout Latin America. Legendary Argentine rockstar Charly García formed his first band, Sui Generis (Folk Rock), which released Argentine rock staples such as Rasguña las piedras (Scratch the Stones) and Canción para mi muerte (Song for My Death). In 1978, Charly García formed the first Latin American supergroup Serú Girán (Progressive Rock), which released some of the greatest rock anthems in Latin America, such as Eiti Leda and Seminare. Luis Alberto Spinetta achieved national acclaim with Almendra, perhaps the first successful progressive rock band in Latin America, their greatest hit was Muchacha (Ojos de papel). Later in 1973, Pescado Rabioso (Spinetta's second band) launched Artaud, for many the magnus opus of Argentine rock.

Other relevant Argentine musicians and bands of the 1970s are Vox Dei, Pappo, Patricio Rey y sus Redonditos de Ricota.

=== Film ===
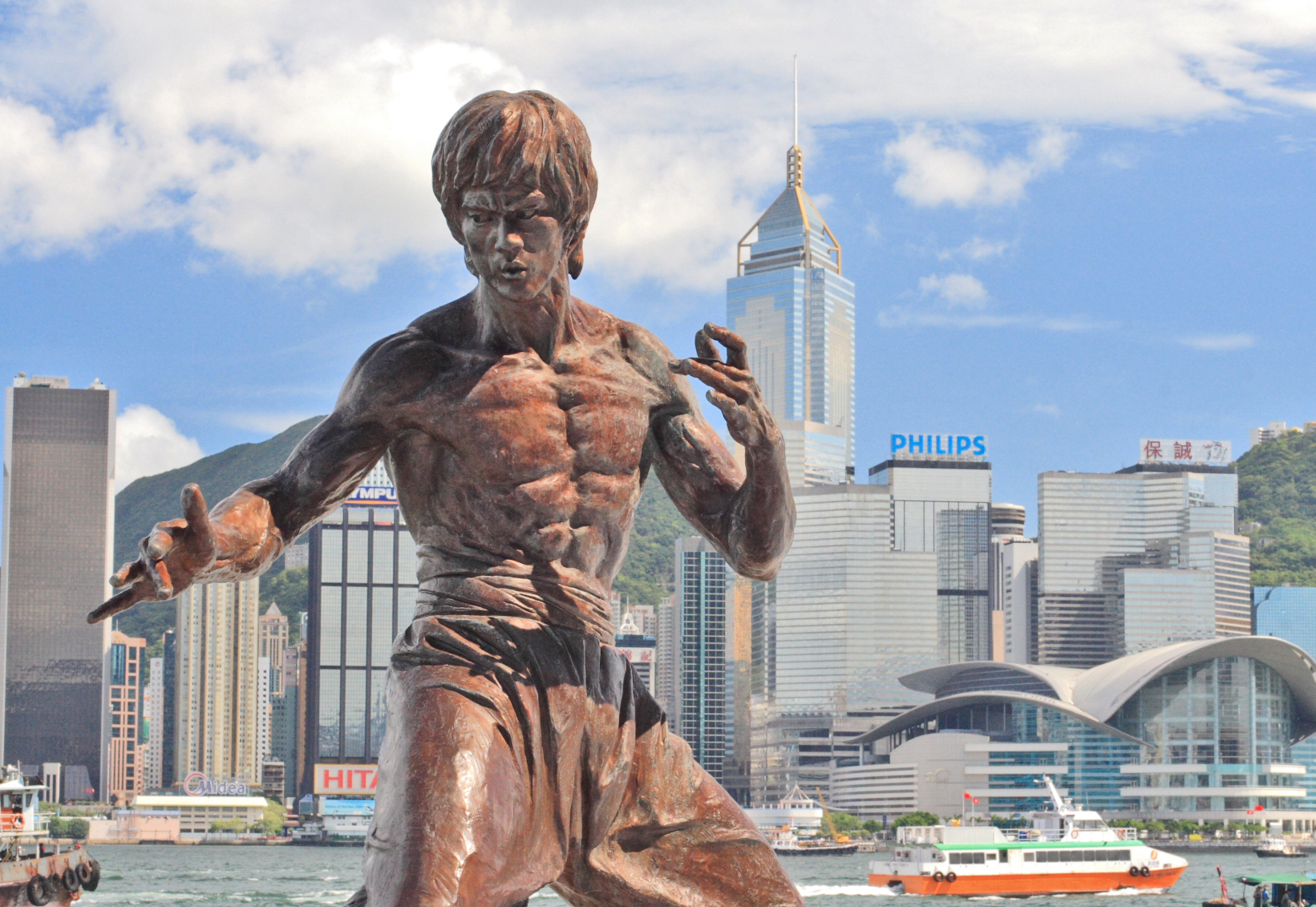
Bruce Lee fostered the popularity of martial arts cinema

Oscar winners of the decade were Patton (1970), The French Connection (1971), The Godfather (1972), The Sting (1973), The Godfather Part II (1974), One Flew Over the Cuckoo's Nest (1975), Rocky (1976), Annie Hall (1977), The Deer Hunter (1978), and Kramer vs. Kramer (1979).

The top ten highest-grossing films of the decade are (in order from highest to lowest grossing): Star Wars, Jaws, Grease, The Exorcist, Close Encounters of the Third Kind, Superman, The Godfather, Saturday Night Fever, Rocky, and Jaws 2. Two of these movies came out on the same day: June 16, 1978.

In 1970s European cinema, the failure of the Prague Spring brought about nostalgic motion pictures such as István Szabó's Szerelmesfilm (1970). German New Wave and Rainer Fassbinder's existential movies characterized film-making in Germany. The movies of the Swedish director Ingmar Bergman reached a new level of expression in motion pictures like Cries and Whispers (1973).

Airport was released in 1970, spawning the air disaster film genre. Throughout the decade, the film spawned three sequels: Airport 1975, Airport '77, and The Concorde... Airport '79. The genre also inspired a spoof film (Airplane!) along with its two sequels in the early 1980s. A slew of other air disaster films followed suit throughout the 1980s and well into the 1990s, primarily in made-for-TV movies.

Car chase movies also became a popular film genre of the 1970s with such films as Dirty Mary, Crazy Larry in 1974, and perhaps the genre's most popular film Smokey and the Bandit in 1977.

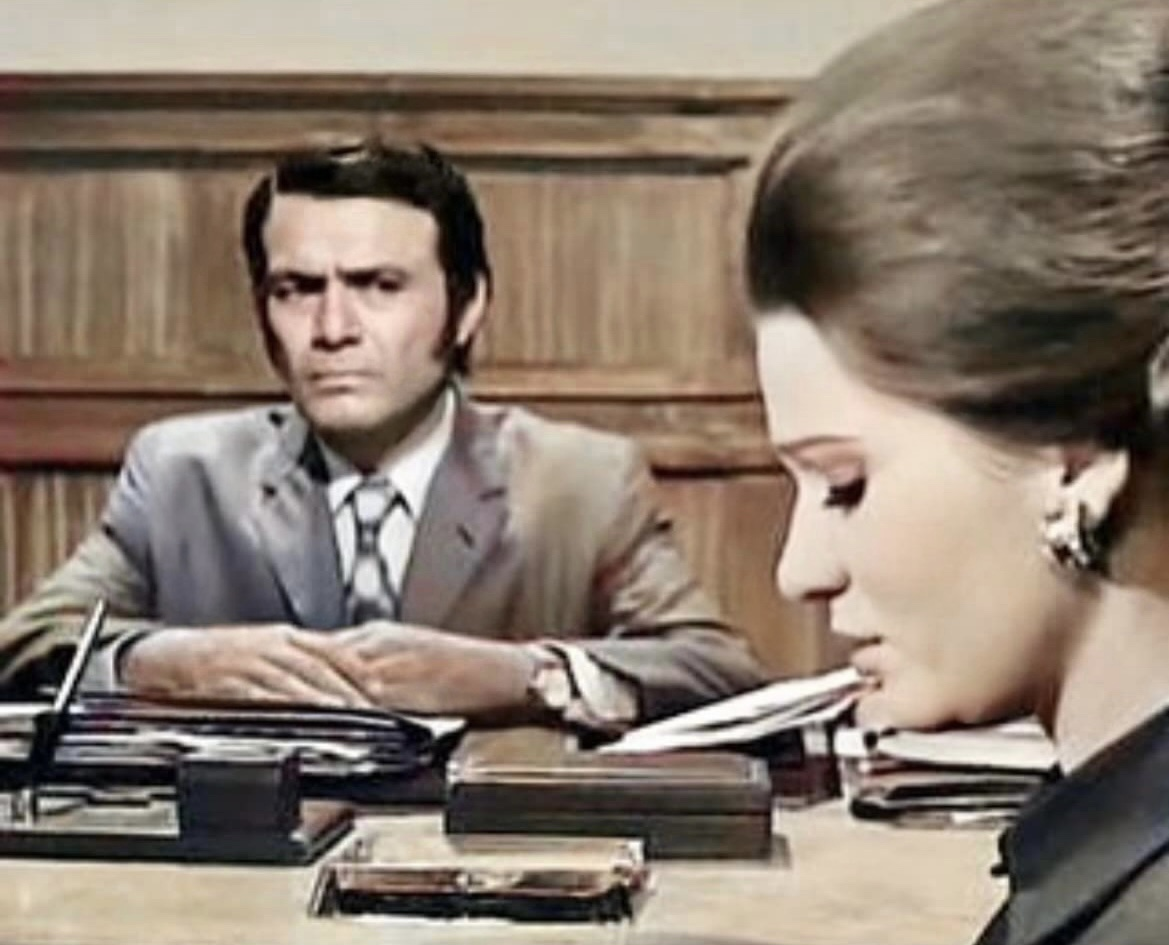
Salah Zulfikar and Zubaida Tharwat in The Other Man (1973)

Asian cinema of the 1970s catered to the rising middle class fantasies and struggles. In the Bollywood cinema of India, this was epitomized by the movies of Bollywood superhero Amitabh Bachchan. Another Asian touchstone beginning in the early 1970s was Hong Kong martial arts film which sparked a greater interest in Chinese martial arts around the world. Martial arts film reached the peak of its popularity largely in part due to its greatest icon, Bruce Lee. During the 1970s, Hollywood continued the New Hollywood movement of the late-1960s with young filmmakers like Francis Ford Coppola, George Lucas, Martin Scorsese and Steven Spielberg, as well as films like Apocalypse Now, The Godfather, Star Wars, Taxi Driver, Jaws, and Close Encounters of the Third Kind. Top-grossing Jaws (1975) ushered in the blockbuster era of filmmaking, though it was eclipsed two years later by the science-fiction film Star Wars (1977), which would later go on to become one of the most successful film franchises in history, spawning two sequels in the original trilogy in the next decade. Saturday Night Fever (1977) single-handedly touched off disco mania in the U.S. The Godfather (1972) was also one of the decade's greatest successes and its first follow-up, The Godfather Part II (1974) was also successful for a sequel.

The Rocky Horror Picture Show flopped in its 1975 debut, only to reappear as a more-popular midnight show later in the decade. Still in limited release decades after its premiere, it is the longest-running theatrical release in film history.

The Exorcist (1973) was a box office success for the horror genre, inspiring many other so-called "devil (Satan)" films like The Omen and both of their own sequels. The release of the movie followed a general mood of paranoia on satanic themes in the United States; also the counterculture of the 1970s saw an increasing interest in occultism.

British comedy troupe Monty Python started making films in the '70s, following the wake of their groundbreaking sketch series Monty Python's Flying Circus. These included And Now for Something Completely Different (which featured film recreations of sketches from the first two series of Flying Circus and new sketches created for the film), the ever-more popular Monty Python and the Holy Grail, and the controversial Monty Python's Life of Brian.

All That Jazz (1979) gained high critical praise, winning four Oscars and several other awards. It was an inductee of the 2001 National Film Registry list.

The Golden Age of Porn continued its reign throughout the 1970s, with one of its most popular films of the decade being Debbie Does Dallas in 1978.

=== Television ===
==== United Kingdom ====
In the United Kingdom, colour channels were now available; three stations had begun broadcasting in colour between 1967 and 1969. However, many viewers continued to watch black-and-white television sets for most of the decade, which meant for example that televised snooker (in which the colour of balls is important) did not reach the heights of its popularity until the 1980s.

Notable dramas included Play for Today and Pennies from Heaven. In police dramas, there was a move towards increasing realism; popular shows included Dixon of Dock Green, Z-Cars, Softly, Softly, and The Sweeney.

The science fiction show Doctor Who reached its peak.

1970s British television featured a mix of traditional more modern comedies and sitcoms. Fawlty Towers, Morecambe and Wise, The Benny Hill Show, Are You Being Served? and Dad's Army had their origins in the variety show and radio comedy of the first half of the century. Many popular British situation comedies (sit-coms) were gentle, unchallenging comedies of middle-class life; typical examples were Terry and June and Sykes. However, the middle-class settings of The Good Life and The Fall and Rise of Reginald Perrin contrasted with their anti-establishment theme of people rejecting traditional social norms. A harsher side of society was shown by comedy series like Porridge and Rising Damp, while sitcoms such as Mind Your Language, Love Thy Neighbour and Till Death Us Do Part reflected social unease brought about by post-war immigration. Spike Milligan's Q and the still-popular Monty Python's Flying Circus both used surreal comedy, originating from the 1950s The Goon Show.

During the 1970s, the original animated television series Roobarb and Noah and Nelly in... SkylArk.

The television information retrieval service Teletext was initially introduced when the BBC Ceefax system went live on 23 September 1974.

In the late 1970s, BBC2's unveiled a new identity, a twin-striped "2", which was the first electronically generated symbol and scrolled on and off the screen.

==== United States ====
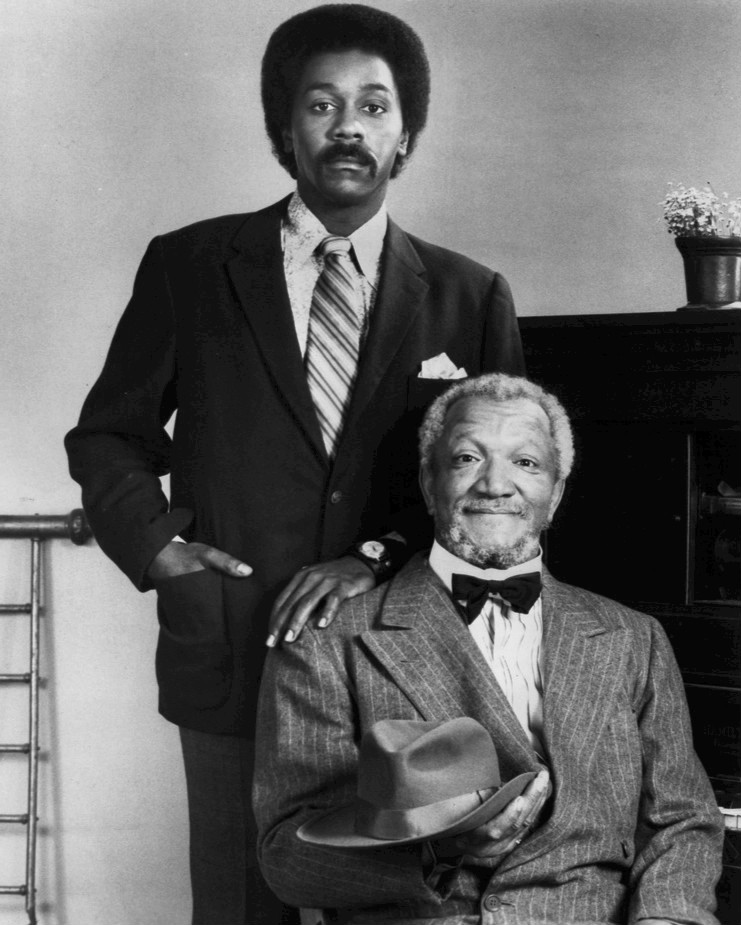
Redd Foxx and Demond Wilson from Sanford and Son

As the 1970s began, the Big Three TV networks were rapidly re-engineering their lineups, noting that existing programs were not attracting the youth audience. Most existing programs still operated on paradigms established in the 1950s, and some shows had literally been on the air since the dawn of TV broadcasting in the late 1940s and early 1950s. Shows that had low ratings or insufficient youth appeal were cancelled as networks scrambled to attract the large baby boomer audience.

To reflect the new social trends, television changed dramatically with more urban and edgy settings, and replaced the popular rural/country wholesome look of the 1950s and 1960s, seen as outmoded and unable to connect with young, educated urban audiences. This particular trend was known as the rural purge. Television was transformed by what became termed as "social consciousness" programming, such as All in the Family and Soap, which broke down television barriers. Many advertising trends of the 1970s also reflected this growing social consciousness trend, such as with Coca-Cola's "Give the World a Coke" and Mcdonalds' "You Deserve a Break" campaigns.

The women's movement ushered in a slew of programming featuring strong, independent females as central characters. Most notable was The Mary Tyler Moore Show, which spawned the successful spin-offs Rhoda and Phyllis, and also resulted in Mary Tyler Moore becoming the first female to head a television production company of her own, MTM Enterprises, which churned out groundbreaking programming in the late 1970s throughout the 1990s. Women were also established portraying action characters in programs like Police Woman, Wonder Woman, The Bionic Woman, and others.

Minority-centric television programming also featured prominently during the 1970s. Shows featuring African-Americans as main characters, such as Sanford and Son, Maude, The Jeffersons, Good Times, Roots and What's Happening!! broke down barriers and became very popular. In addition, Soul Train, the brainchild of Don Cornelius, premiered in 1971 as the African-American counterpart to American Bandstand, giving a forum for soul, funk, jazz, R&B, disco, and future rap and hip-hop artists to gain exposure to American audiences, consumers, music lovers, enthusiasts, and those keen on learning new dance moves.

The television western, which had been very popular in the 1950s and 1960s, all but died out during the 1970s, with Bonanza, The Virginian, and Gunsmoke ending their runs. Replacing westerns were police and detective shows, a trend that would last through the 1980s.

Television still had its medical shows of the 1970s, however, Emergency! was the first popular medical drama ever to feature both the paramedic program as well as the hospital emergency department, which also encouraged future people in the United States to develop their own paramedic program or hospital emergency department, and acted as an inspiration for many individuals. Marcus Welby, M.D. and Medical Center were other long-running medical dramas popular during the 1970s.

1950s nostalgia and pop culture became a theme in prime-time sitcoms with the Garry Marshall-produced Happy Days and its two spin-offs Laverne & Shirley and Mork & Mindy.

By the mid-to-late 1970s, jiggle television—programs oriented toward sexual gratification and farce comedy and situations—became popular. Such programs included Charlie's Angels, The Love Boat, and perhaps the genre's most popular, Three's Company.

Soap operas expanded their audiences beyond housewives with the rise of All My Children, As the World Turns, Somerset, and The Young and the Restless; with many extending their episodes from 30 minutes to an hour. The soap Another World began a 16-month experiment in March 1979 by screening 90-minute episodes, the only serial to do so.

Game shows such as Match Game, The Hollywood Squares, Family Feud, and many others, saw their golden ages on daytime television. The height of Match Game's popularity occurred between 1973 and 1977, before it was overtaken by Family Feud in 1978. Television's current longest-running game show, The Price Is Right, began its run hosted by Bob Barker in 1972.

Another influential genre was the television newscast, which built on its initial widespread success in the 1960s.

The science fiction phenomenon of the late 1970s that began with Star Wars went to television with shows such as Battlestar Galactica.

Variety shows, a staple of TV programming since the beginning, were also re-engineered to appeal to young viewers. Old standbys such as The Ed Sullivan Show and The Red Skelton Show were canceled and replaced by hipper programming like Sonny and Cher Comedy Hour and Donny & Marie. The Carol Burnett Show also ended its historic 11-year run in 1978. In the end, rising production costs largely did in variety shows. The exception was Saturday Night Live (then known as NBC's Saturday Night), which was created by Lorne Michaels and premiered in 1975, with an original cast of Laraine Newman, John Belushi, Jane Curtin, Gilda Radner, Dan Aykroyd, Garrett Morris, and Chevy Chase. The country music variety show Hee Haw, which premiered in 1969, was the only series to survive the "rural purge" and continued throughout the 70s, 80s, and into the 1990s before ending its run, although the series went into syndication after its first three seasons.

Sesame Street, which debuted in 1969, would continue to run for the entire decade. Puppeteer Jim Henson who worked on that show would also be behind The Muppet Show. Henson produced two pilot episodes for ABC in 1974 and 1975, but neither went forward as a series. While other networks in the United States rejected Henson's proposals, British producer Lew Grade expressed enthusiasm for the project and agreed to co-produce The Muppet Show for ATV, part of the UK ITV network. The series premiered in the UK on 5 September 1976 and ended on 23 May 1981. Five seasons, totalling 120 episodes, were broadcast on ATV and other ITV franchises in the UK and in first-run syndication in the United States from 1976 to 1981.

The Dukes of Hazzard began its six-year run in 1979. The series was inspired by the car-chase film genre, particularly the 1975 film Moonrunners, on which the series was based, with similar characters and scenes; and both were directed by Gy Waldron and voice-over narrated by country music artist Waylon Jennings.

===== Pay television =====
As cable television became more affordable and accessible by U.S. consumers, the race to bring the silver screen to the small screen commenced with the launch of pay television services showing premium content.

HBO launched on November 8, 1972, becoming the nation's first pay-television channel. On September 30, 1975, HBO became the first television network to continuously deliver signals via satellite when it showed the Thrilla in Manila boxing match between Muhammad Ali and Joe Frazier.

Star Channel launched its service offerings nationally in 1973 through the delivery of movies on videotapes for cable providers to broadcast. This proved problematic since the videotapes were often riddled with technical difficulties. Star Channel eventually was linked up to satellite in January 1978. Shortly after, Warner Communications acquired the channel and relaunched it on December 1, 1979, in its current form as The Movie Channel.

Media giant Viacom launched their premium service, Showtime, nationally on July 1, 1976, after a brief, successful test launch on their cable system in Dublin, California.

==== Australia ====
In 1974, Australian TV tested color transmissions (full-time color came in 1975). Popular shows during the decade include, Young Talent Time, Number 96, The Aunty Jack Show, Class of '74, The Sullivans, The Don Lane Show, Cop Shop, The Naked Vicar Show, The Paul Hogan Show and Countdown.

==== South Africa ====
South Africa saw nationwide television service for the first time on January 5, 1976, although limited-view, locally available television began on May 5, 1975.

==== Japan ====
The original anime television series Vicky the Viking, Heidi, Maya the Bee and Doraemon in both 1974, 1975 and 1979, respectively.

=== Computer and video games ===
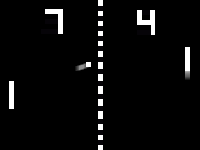
Pong (1972)

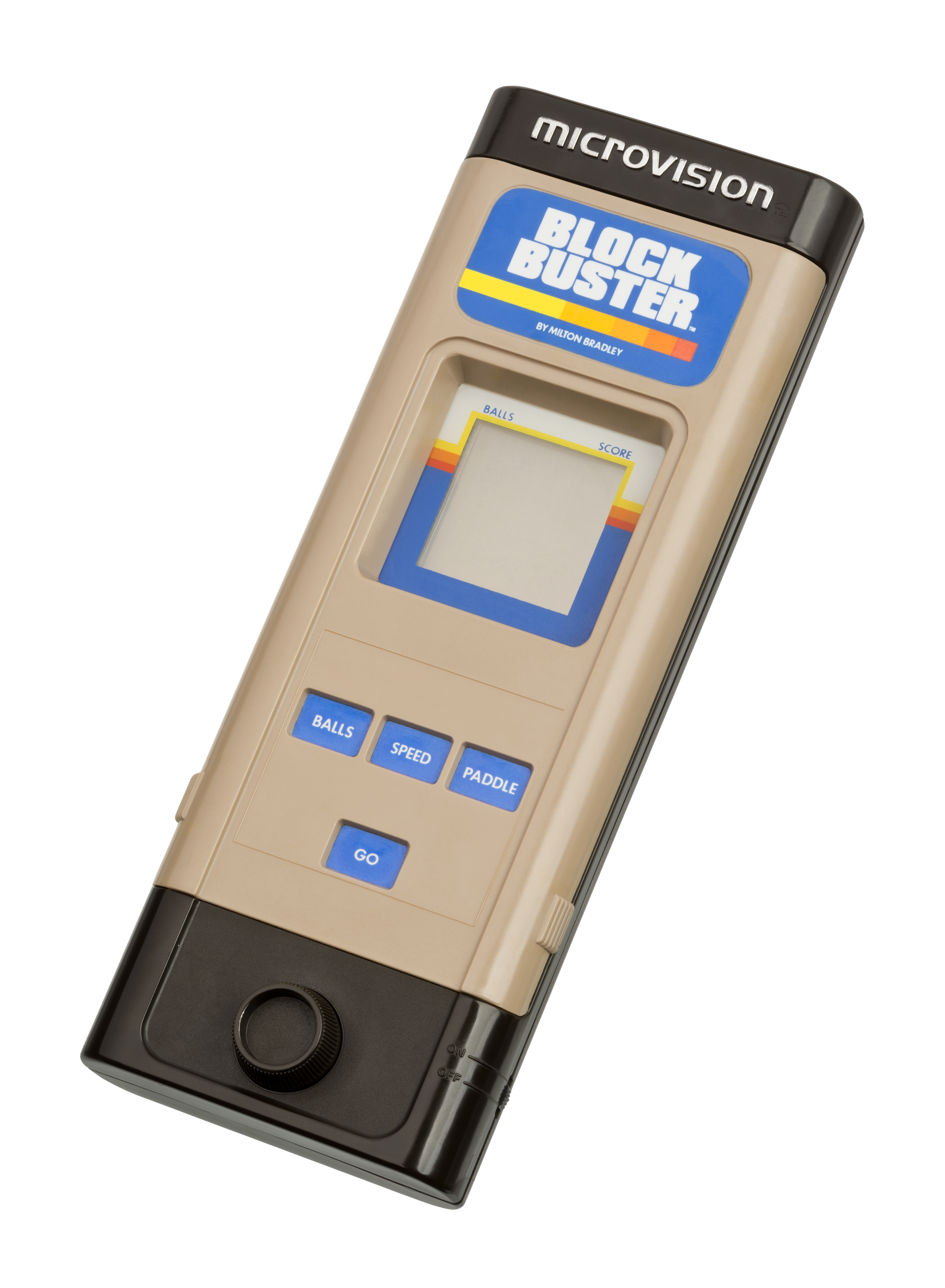
Microvision (1979) is the first handheld game console that used interchangeable cartridges.

- Popular and notable video games of the 1970s include: Space Invaders, Asteroids, Pong, and Breakout.
- Golden age of video arcade games
- Gun Fight was the first video game to contain a microprocessor.
- The Oregon Trail was the first publicly available educational video game made available for widespread use in schools on December 3, 1971. The game is a cult classic and is still used today, in a wide variety of formats, through emulators and on smartphones.
- The first commercially available video game console, entitled Magnavox Odyssey, was released in September 1972, created by Ralph H. Baer.
- 1974: Both Maze War (on the Imlac PDS-1 at the NASA Ames Research Center in California) and Spasim (on PLATO) appeared, pioneering examples of early multiplayer 3D first-person shooters.
- In 1976, Mattel introduced the first handheld electronic game with the release of Mattel Auto Race.
- Then, in 1976, William Crowther wrote the first modern text adventure game, Colossal Cave Adventure.
- Apple, Inc. ushered in the modern personal computing age with its June 1, 1977, launch of the first mass-produced personal computer, the Apple II. Although many business-focused personal workstations were available to corporations years earlier, the Apple II has the distinction of being the first to produce personal computers specifically targeted to home users, beating the Commodore PET and Atari 400 to the market by five months. The original retail price of the computer was US$1298 (with 4 KB of RAM) and US$2638 (with the maximum 48 KB of RAM).
- The Atari 2600 was released in October 1977 and was a huge commercial success. It was challenged by the Magnavox Odyssey² and Intellivision.
- Fairchild Channel F from 1976 becomes the first programmable ROM cartridge-based video game console.
- The Microvision was the first hand-held game console using interchangeable cartridges. It was released by the Milton Bradley Company in November 1979.

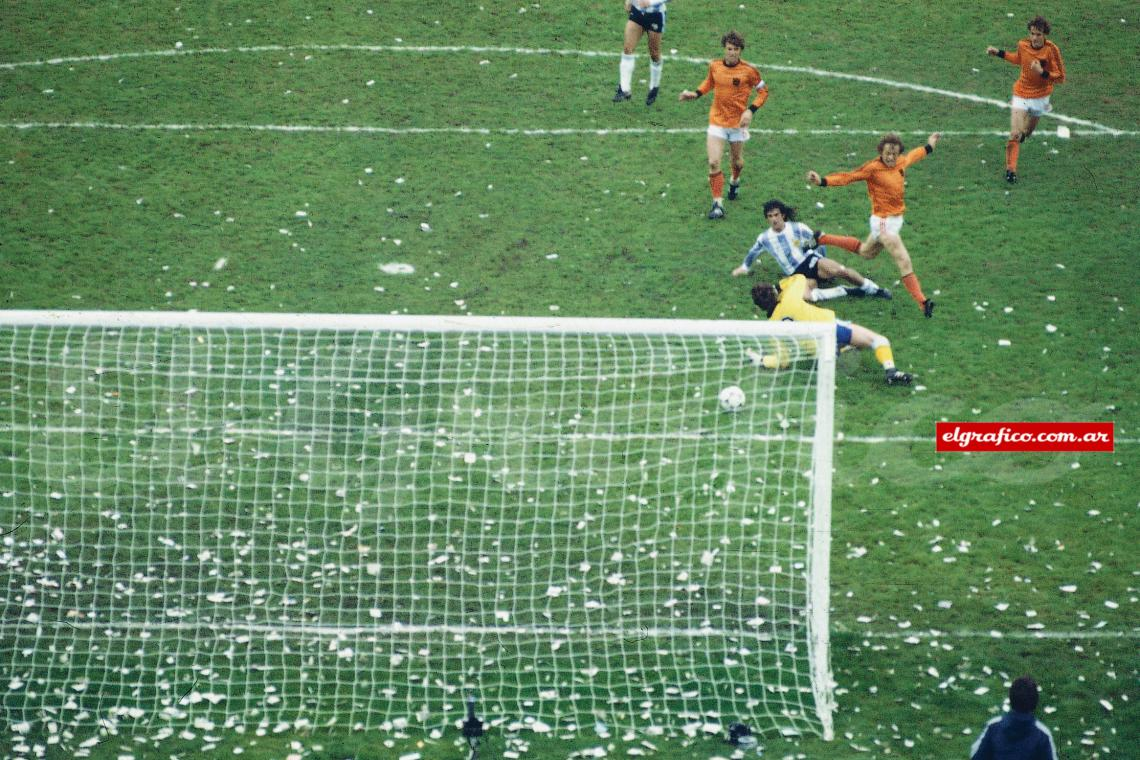
Mario Kempes scores the first goal in the 1978 World Cup Final for Argentina

=== Sports ===
The 1972 Summer Olympics in Munich, Germany saw swimmer Mark Spitz set seven World Records and won a record seven gold medals. The 1976 Summer Olympics were held in Montreal, Quebec, Canada. Brazil won the 1970 FIFA World Cup in Mexico, West Germany won the 1974 FIFA World Cup in West Germany, and Argentina won the 1978 FIFA World Cup in Argentina. The 1970 FIFA World Cup was the first world cup to be televised in color.

On April 9, 1975, Asia's first professional basketball league, the Philippine Basketball Association (PBA) had its first game at the Araneta Coliseum in Cubao, Quezon City, Philippines.

==== United States ====
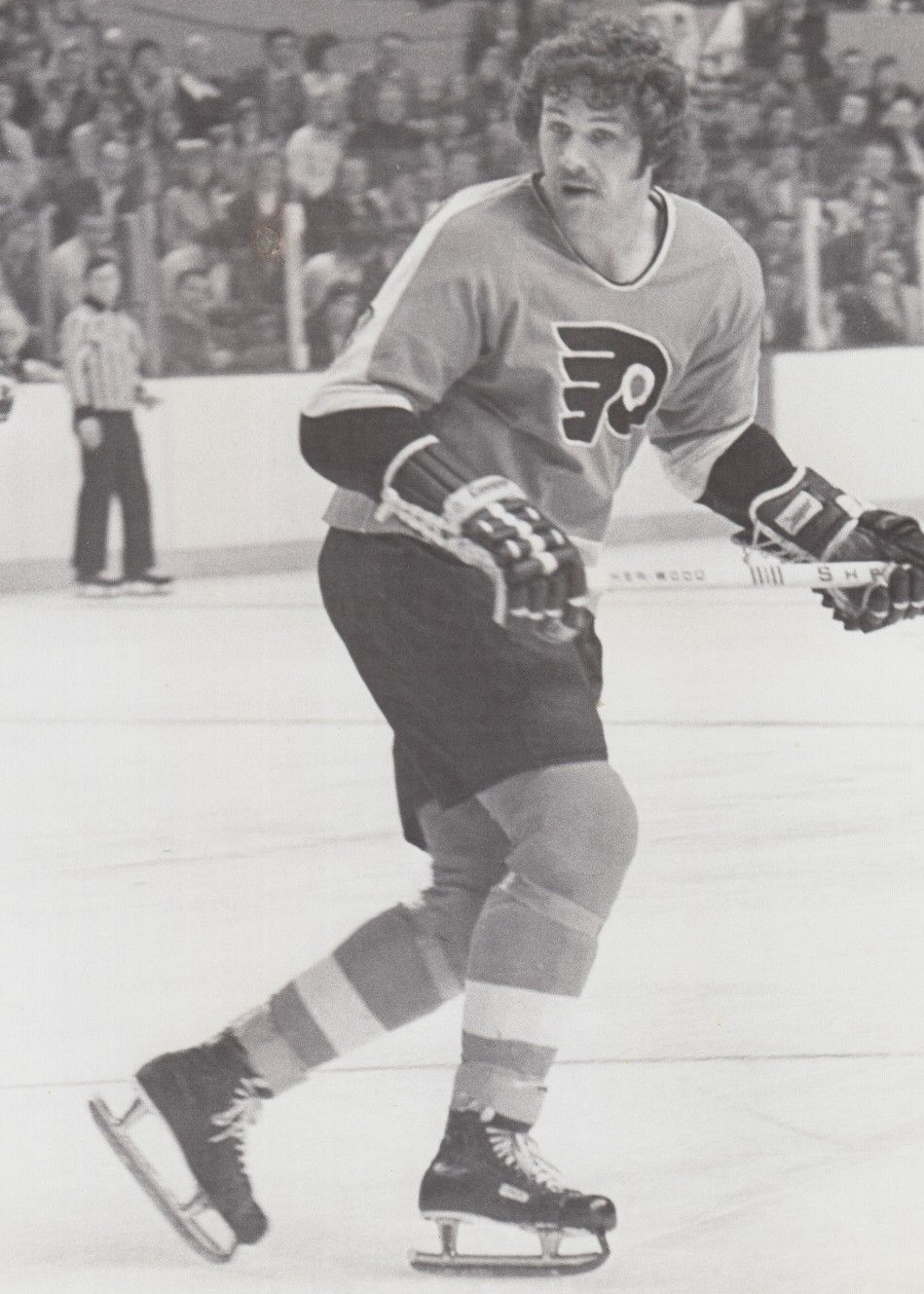
Dave Schultz won Stanley Cup two times

The Oakland Athletics three-peated at the World Series in 1972–1974.

The Cincinnati Reds go to the World Series in 1970, 1972, 1975, and 1976, led by the Big Red Machine winning two out of four.

The New York Yankees won the World Series in 1977 and 1978 after losing in 1976.

The Dallas Cowboys and the Pittsburgh Steelers dominated the decade in the NFL. Steelers were led by Terry Bradshaw and Chuck Noll, and the Cowboys were led by Roger Staubach and Tom Landry, while the Miami Dolphins became the only team in NFL history to go "all the way," winning the Super Bowl with an undefeated record—a feat that remains unmatched to this day.

The 1970s saw the construction of several sports venues, including Arrowhead Stadium, Three Rivers Stadium, Texas Stadium, Veterans Stadium, Riverfront Stadium, and Mercedes-Benz Superdome.

The Philadelphia Flyers won the Stanley Cup in 1974 and 1975, a team best remembered as "The Broad Street Bullies".

==== Disc sports (Frisbee) ====
As numbers of young people became alienated from social norms, they resisted and looked for alternatives. They would form what would become known as the counterculture. The forms of escape and resistance would manifest in many ways including social activism, alternative lifestyles, experimental living through foods, dress, music and alternative recreational activities, including that of throwing a frisbee. What started with a few players like Victor Malafronte, Z Weyand and Ken Westerfield experimenting with new ways of throwing and catching a frisbee, later would become known as playing freestyle. Organized disc sports, in the 1970s, began with promotional efforts from Wham-O and Irwin Toy (Canada), a few tournaments and professionals using frisbee show tours to perform at universities, fairs and sporting events. Disc sports such as freestyle, double disc court, guts, disc ultimate and disc golf became this sports first events.

=== Literature ===
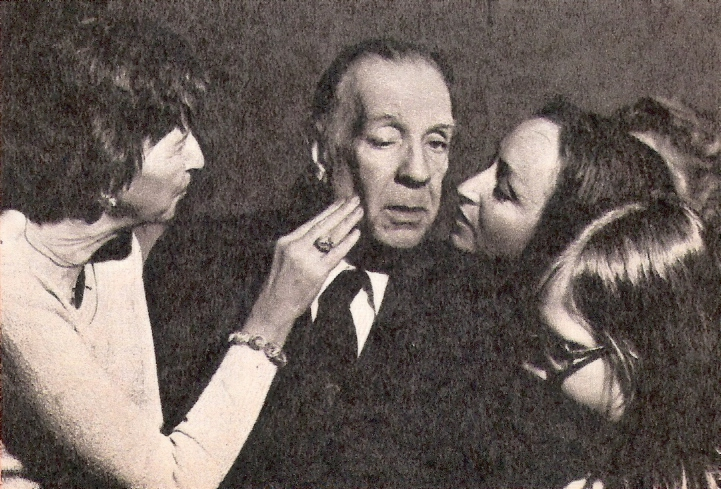
Jorge Luis Borges with admirers in 1976.

Fiction in the early 1970s brought a return to old-fashioned storytelling, especially with Erich Segal's Love Story. The seventies also saw the decline of previously well-respected writers, such as Saul Bellow and Peter De Vries, who both released poorly received novels at the start of the decade. Racism remained a key literary subject. John Updike emerged as a major literary figure. Reflections on the 1960s experience also found roots in the literature of the decade through the works of Joyce Carol Oates and Wright Morris. With the rising cost of hard-cover books and the increasing readership of genre fiction, the paperback became a popular medium. Criminal non-fiction also became a popular topic. Irreverence and satire, typified in Kurt Vonnegut's Breakfast of Champions, were common literary elements. The horror genre also emerged, and by the late 1970s Stephen King had become one of the most popular genre novelists. The postmodern author Thomas Pynchon published his most famous work, Gravity's Rainbow, in 1973.

In non-fiction, several books related to Nixon and the Watergate scandal topped the best-selling lists. 1977 brought many high-profile biographical works of literary figures, such as those of Virginia Woolf, Agatha Christie, and J. R. R. Tolkien.

The fake memoir Go Ask Alice was released in 1971. Upon its initial release the book was marketed as a real diary of a teenage girl who overdosed in the 1960s. However, it was later revealed that the book was actually written by Beatrice Sparks.

Jorge Luis Borges published Dr. Brodie's Report in 1970 and The Book Of Sand in 1975.

Julio Cortázar published Octaedro in 1974.

Ernesto Sábato published Abaddón The Exterminator, his last novel, in 1974.

=== Architecture ===
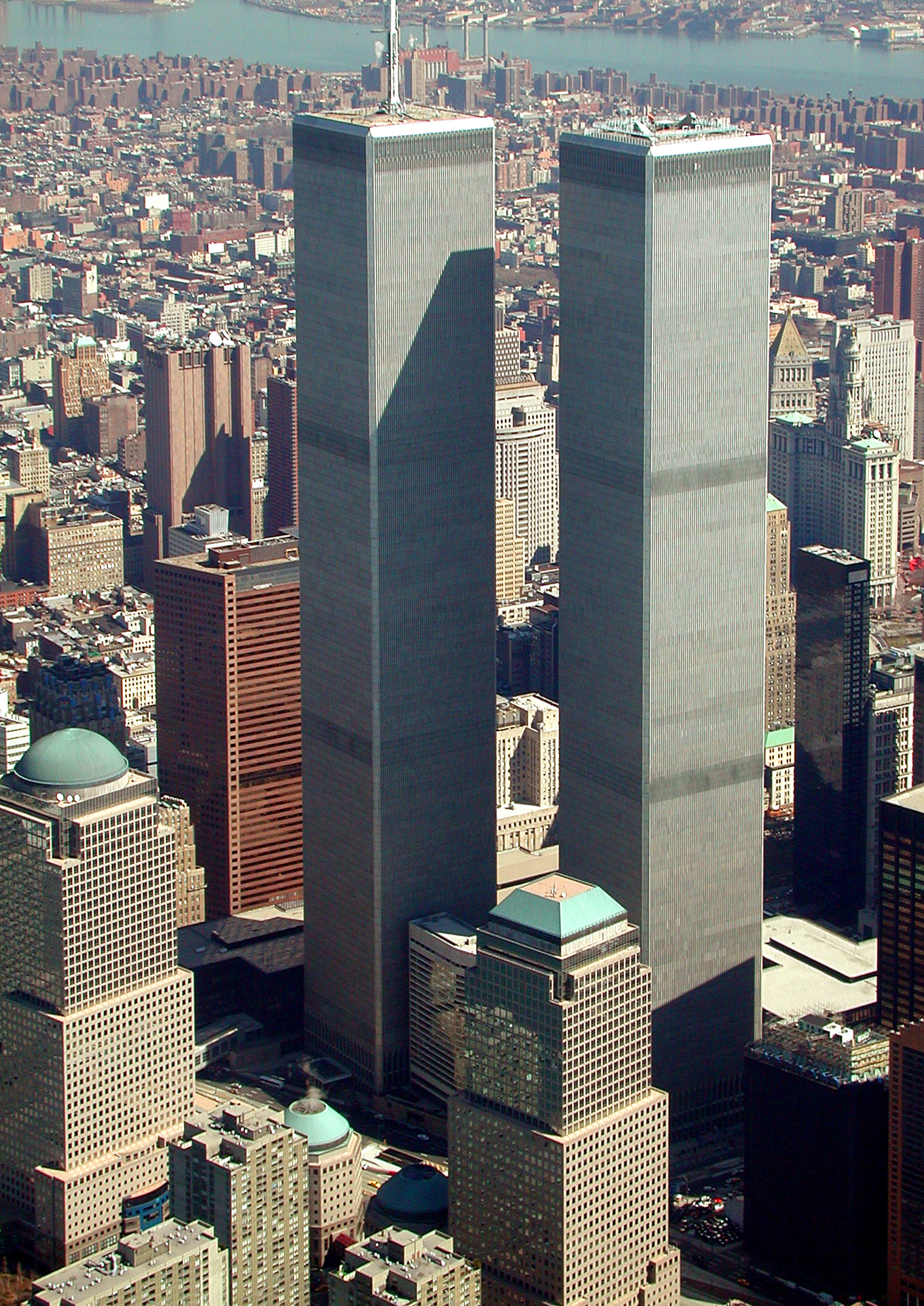
The World Trade Center towers were the world's tallest buildings from 1972 to 1973.

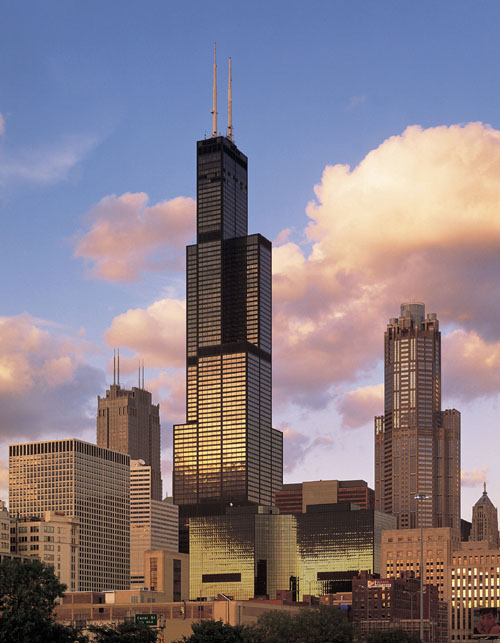
The Sears Tower became the world's tallest building when completed in 1973.

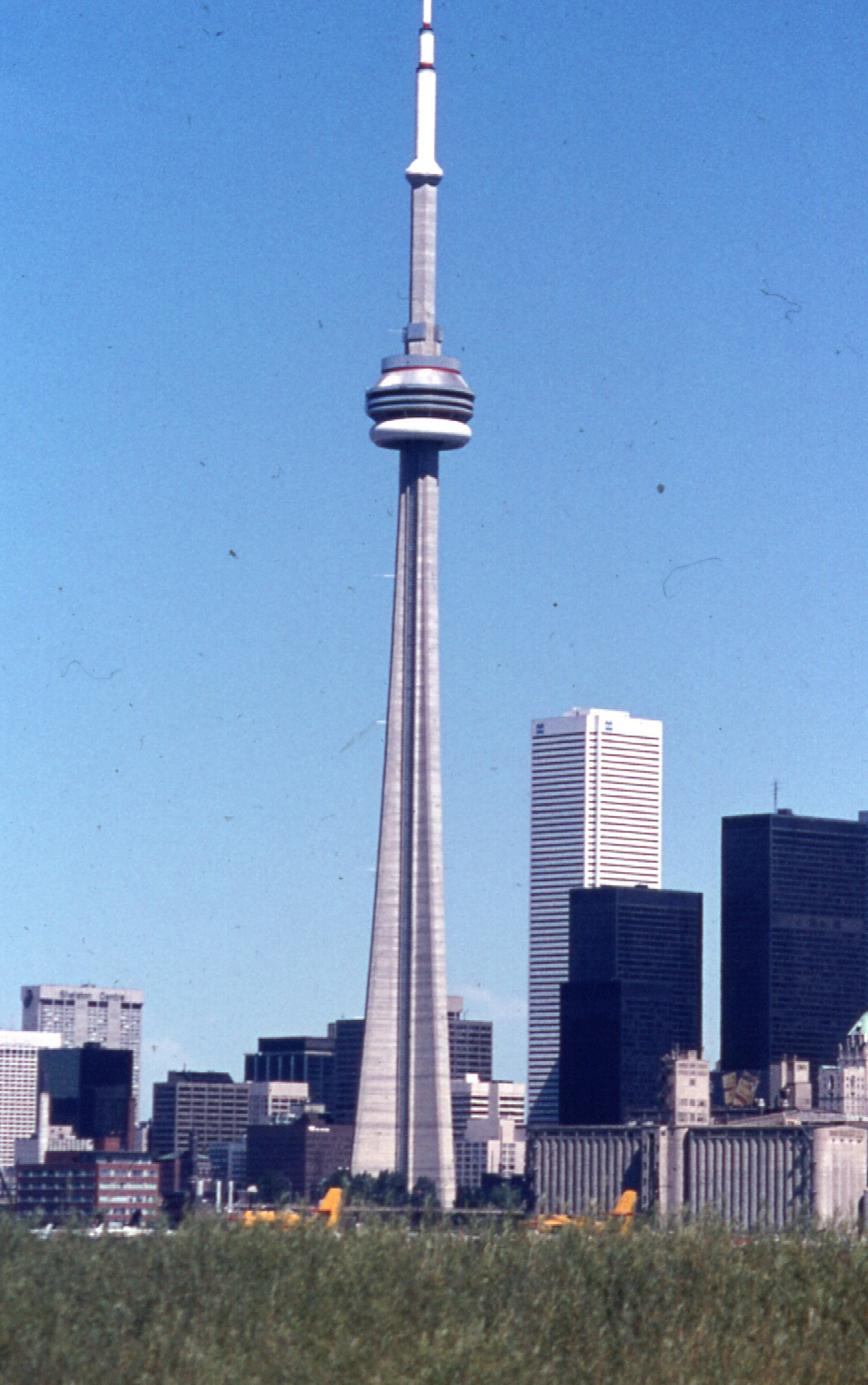
The CN Tower was completed in 1976, becoming the world's tallest free-standing structure.

Architecture in the 1970s began as a continuation of styles created by such architects as Frank Lloyd Wright and Ludwig Mies van der Rohe. Early in the decade, several architects competed to build the tallest building in the world. Of these buildings, the most notable are the John Hancock Center and Sears Tower in Chicago, both designed by Bruce Graham and Fazlur Khan, and the World Trade Center towers in New York by American architect Minoru Yamasaki. The decade also brought experimentation in geometric design, pop-art, postmodernism, and early deconstructivism.

Design trends in the 1970s were marked by a backlash against the bright colors and futurism of the 1950s and 1960s and a rise in popularity of dark, earthy tones with extensive use of brown, green, purple, and orange. Wood decor and paneling was integral to 1970s interior design as well, replacing the obsession of the 1950s and 1960s with chrome and aluminum. Darker colors not only reflected the back-to-nature mindset of the decade, but the sluggish world economy with its lowered optimism and expectations for the future.

In 1974, Louis Kahn's last and arguably most famous building, the National Assembly Building of Dhaka, Bangladesh, was completed. The building's use of open spaces and groundbreaking geometry brought rare attention to the small South Asian country. Hugh Stubbins's Citicorp Center revolutionized the incorporation of solar panels in office buildings. The seventies brought further experimentation in glass and steel construction and geometric design. Chinese architect I. M. Pei's John Hancock Tower in Boston, Massachusetts, is an example, although like many buildings of the time, the experimentation was flawed and glass panes fell from the façade. In 1976, the completed CN Tower in Toronto became the world's tallest free-standing structure on land, an honor it held until 2007. The fact that no taller tower had been built between the construction of the CN Tower and the Burj Khalifa shows how innovative the architecture and engineering of the structure truly were.

Modern architecture was increasingly criticized as the decade went on from the point of view of postmodern architects, such as Philip Johnson, Charles Moore, and Michael Graves, who advocated a return to pre-modern styles of architecture and the incorporation of pop elements as a means of communicating with a broader public. Other architects, such as Peter Eisenman of the New York Five, advocated the pursuit of form for the sake of form and drew on semiotics theory for support.

"High Tech" architecture moved forward as Buckminster Fuller continued his experiments in geodesic domes, while the Georges Pompidou Center, designed by Renzo Piano and Richard Rogers, which opened in 1977, was a prominent example. As the decade drew to a close, Frank Gehry broke out in a new direction with his own house in Santa Monica, a highly complex structure, half excavated out of an existing bungalow and half cheaply built construction using materials such as chicken wire fencing.

Terracotta Army figures, dating from 210 BC, were discovered in 1974 by some local farmers in Lintong District, Xi'an, Shaanxi Province, China, near the Mausoleum of the First Qin Emperor (Chinese: 秦始皇陵; pinyin: Qín Shǐhuáng Ling). In 1978, electrical workers in Mexico City found the remains of the Great Pyramid of Tenochtitlan in the middle of the city.

=== Fashion ===
Clothing styles during the 1970s were influenced by outfits seen in popular music groups and in Hollywood films. In clothing, prints, especially from India and other parts of the world, were fashionable.

Much of the 1970s fashion styles were influenced by the hippie movement. As well as the hippie look, the 70s also gave way to glam rock styles, started off by David Bowie who was named the King of Glam Rock. Glam was a genderbent and outlandish style.

Significant fashion trends of the 1970s include:

- Bell-bottomed pants remained popular throughout the decade. These combined with turtle necked shirts and flower-prints to form the characteristic 1970s look. In the later part of the decade, this gave way to three-piece suits, in large part because of the movie Saturday Night Fever.
- Sideburns were popular for men, particularly mutton chops; as were beards and mustaches which had been out of fashion since the 19th and early 20th century.
- Women's hairstyles went from long and straight in the first half of the decade to the feathery cut of Farrah Fawcett, a trend that continued through the first half of the 1980s.
- Miniskirts and minidresses were still popular in the first half of the decade, particularly with pleated "rah-rah" skirts with higher hemlines; but they were quickly phased out by the mid-70s in favor of hot pants. However, miniskirts and minidresses never totally went away, and they made a return to mainstream fashion in the mid-1980s and has remained a fashion staple in the decades since.
- Crop tops and hot pants became popular summer outfits among young women and teenage girls in the second half of the decade.
- Platform shoes
- Leisure suits
- Mohawk hairstyle was associated with punk subculture
- Flokati rugs
- Lava lamps
- Papasan chairs
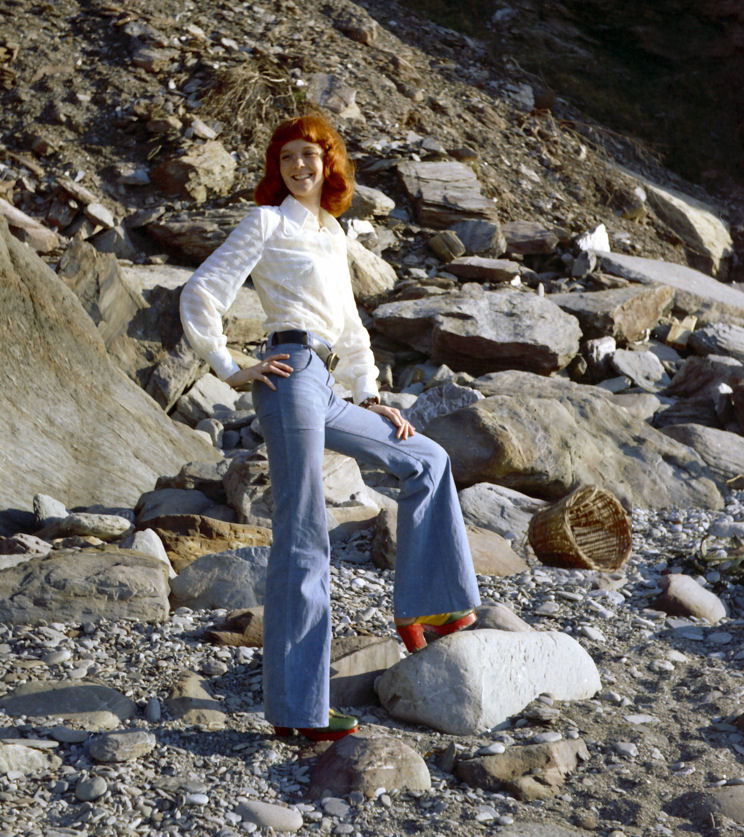
Bell-bottomed pants were especially popular throughout the decade

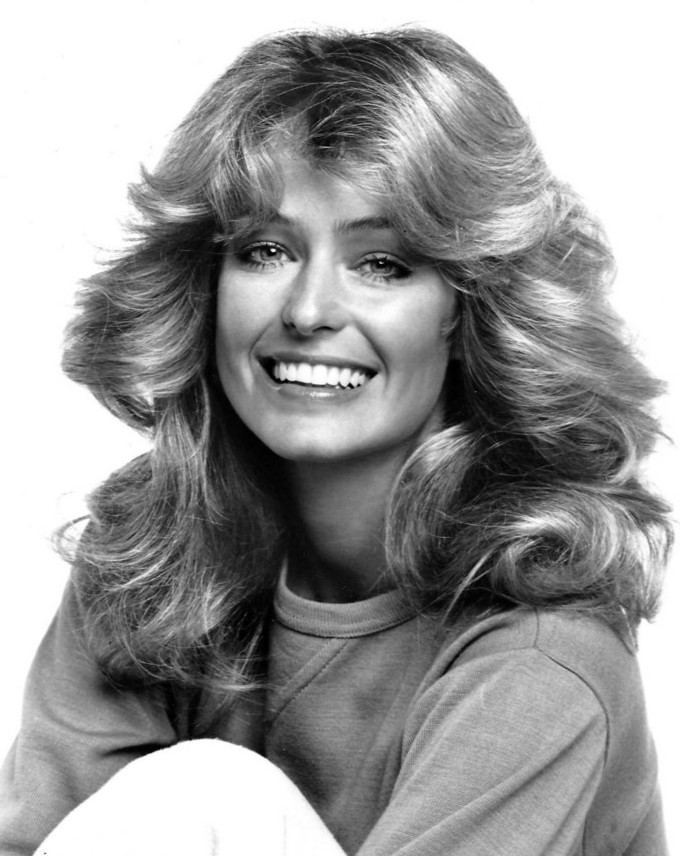
The Farrah Fawcett hairstyle was considered particularly fashionable during the decade

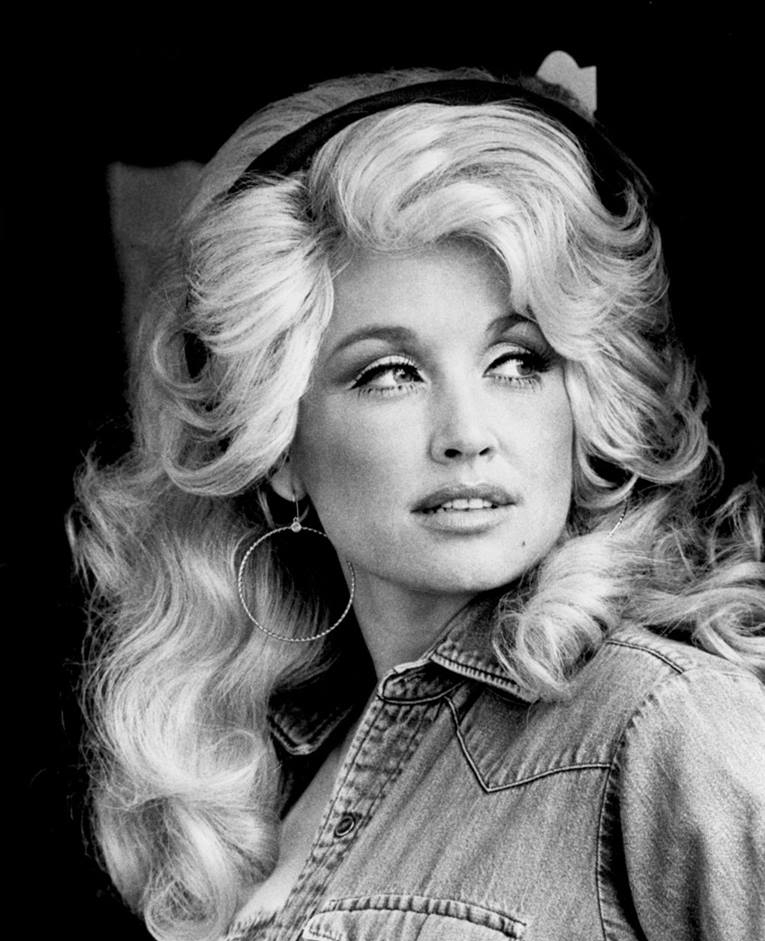
Denim jackets and headbands were also a trend, modeled here by Dolly Parton in 1977

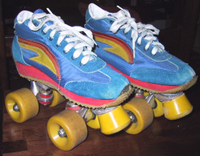
Roller-skating was at its peak in the 1970s, and was closely associated with disco music and roller discos

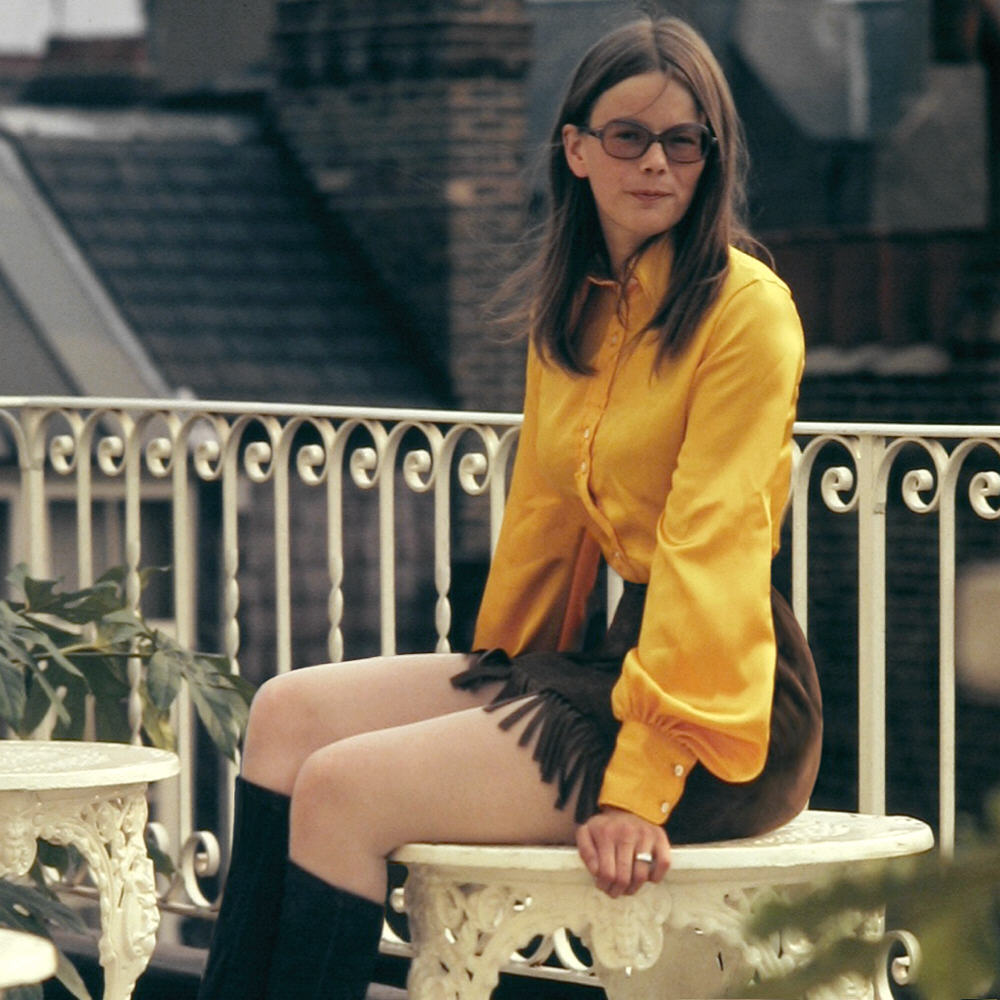
Miniskirts were still popular in the first half of the decade

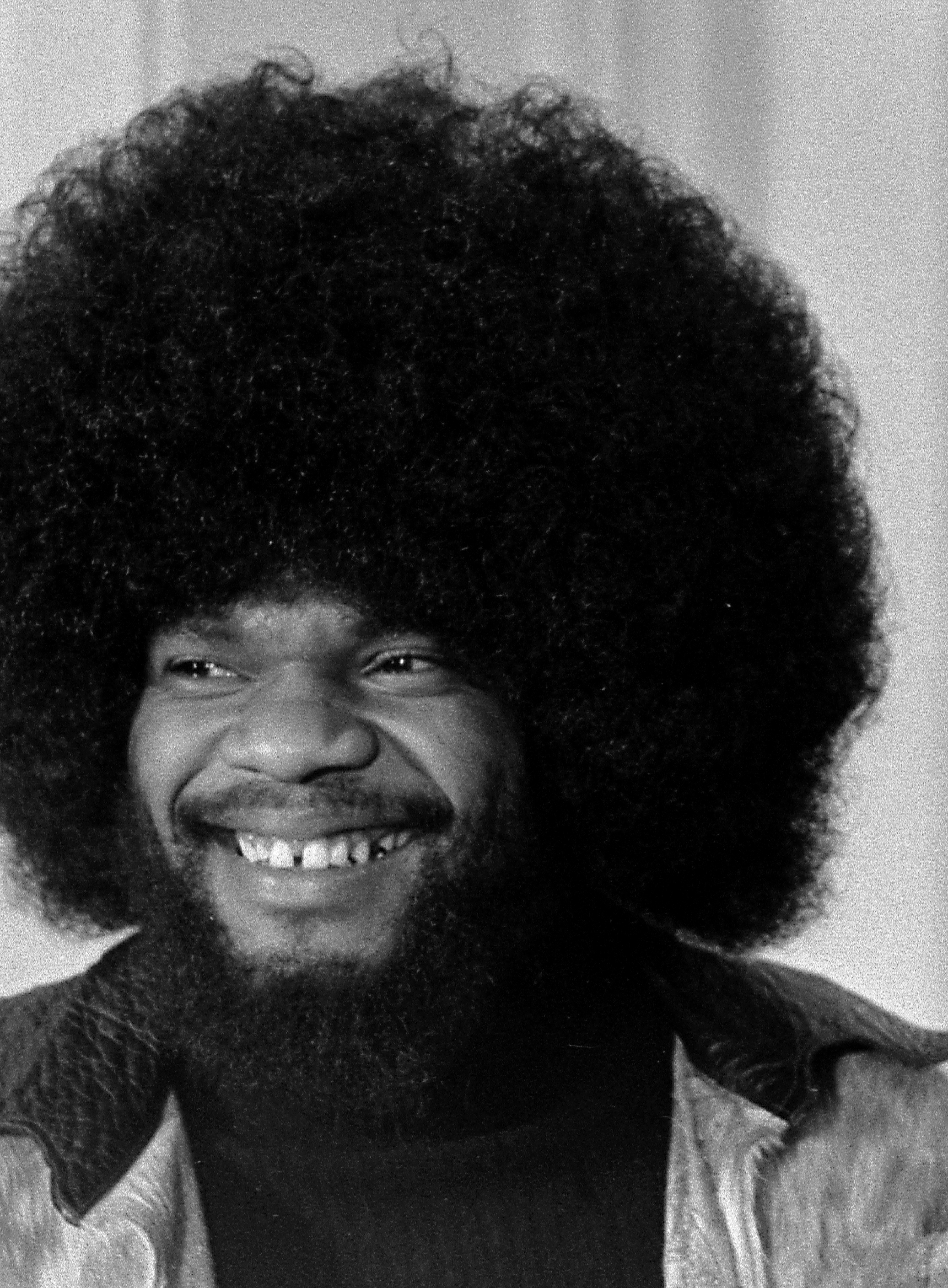
Billy Preston sporting an afro in 1974

== People ==
=== Scientists and engineers ===
- Frédéric d'Allest
- Manolis Andronikos
- Paul Breedlove
- Enrico Bombieri
- Herbert Boyer
- M. George Craford
- Vint Cerf
- Clifford Cocks
- Martin Cooper
- Gordon Coppuck
- Lynn Conway
- Seymour Cray
- Allan M. Cormack
- Andre de Cortanze
- Gérard Ducarouge
- Whitfield Diffie
- James H. Ellis
- Federico Faggin
- Mauro Forghieri
- Derek Gardner
- Sheldon Glashow
- B.J. Habibie
- Raymond Heacock
- Kazuo Hashimoto
- Stephen Hawking
- Martin Hellman
- Godfrey Hounsfield
- Rudolf Hruska
- Russell Alan Hulse
- John Iliopoulos
- Robert E. Kahn
- Alan Kay
- F.R.Khan
- Daniel Kahneman
- John O'Keefe
- Nobutoshi Kihara
- Ron Rivest
- Tony Rudd
- Georges J. F. Köhler
- Ludwig Kraus
- Paul Lauterbur
- Luciano Maiani
- Östen Mäkitalo
- Benoit Mandelbrot
- Grigori Margulis
- Carver Mead
- Ralph Merkle
- César Milstein
- David Mumford
- Daniel Nathans
- Charles Fefferman
- Chuck Peddle
- Harvey Postlethwaite
- Dennis Ritchie
- Colin Renfrew
- Paul Rosche
- Steven Sasson
- Frederic Sanger
- Hamilton O. Smith
- Tony Southgate
- Paolo Stanzani
- Patrick Steptoe
- Shizuo Takano
- Fabio Taglioni
- Robert Tarjan
- Charles Thacker
- Ken Thompson
- Lino Tonti
- Amos Tversky
- Malcolm J. Williamson
- M. Stanley Whittingham
- Steve Wozniak

=== Actors / Entertainers ===
- Mario Adorf
- Jack Albertson
- Alan Alda
- Nancy Allen
- Woody Allen
- John Amos
- Ursula Andress
- Julie Andrews
- Alan Arkin
- Bea Arthur
- Ed Asner
- Richard Attenborough
- Margaret Avery
- Dan Aykroyd
- Amitabh Bachchan
- Conrad Bain
- Tom Baker
- Martin Balsam
- Ned Beatty
- Warren Beatty
- Jean-Paul Belmondo
- John Belushi
- Jane Birkin
- Jacqueline Bisset
- Bill Bixby
- Karen Black
- Linda Blair
- Ernest Borgnine
- Tom Bosley
- Peter Boyle
- Marlon Brando
- Eric Braeden
- Beau Bridges
- Jeff Bridges
- Eileen Brennan
- James Brolin
- Mel Brooks
- Charles Bronson
- Jim Brown
- Roscoe Lee Browne
- Yul Brynner
- Carol Burnett
- Ellen Burstyn
- Richard Burton
- Raymond Burr
- Gary Busey
- James Caan
- Sid Caesar
- Michael Caine
- Colleen Camp
- John Candy
- Claudia Cardinale
- George Carlin
- David Carradine
- Keith Carradine
- Diahann Carroll
- Johnny Carson
- Lynda Carter
- David Cassidy
- John Cassavetes
- Richard Chamberlain
- Geraldine Chaplin
- Jackie Chan
- Chevy Chase
- Julie Christie
- Jill Clayburgh
- John Cleese
- James Coburn
- James Coco
- Joan Collins
- Sean Connery
- Mike Connors
- Tim Conway
- Bill Cosby
- Richard Crenna
- Billy Crystal
- Jamie Lee Curtis
- Tony Curtis
- Peter Cushing
- Rodney Dangerfield
- Blythe Danner
- Bruce Davison
- Dom DeLuise
- Alain Delon
- Catherine Deneuve
- Brian Dennehy
- Robert De Niro
- Gérard Depardieu
- Bruce Dern
- Danny DeVito
- Joyce DeWitt
- Kirk Douglas
- Michael Douglas
- David Doyle
- Richard Dreyfuss
- Faye Dunaway
- Charles Durning
- Robert Duvall
- Shelley Duvall
- Clint Eastwood
- Barbara Eden
- Britt Ekland
- Peter Falk
- Mia Farrow
- Farrah Fawcett
- José Ferrer
- Sally Field
- Albert Finney
- Carrie Fisher
- Louise Fletcher
- Jane Fonda
- Peter Fonda
- Harrison Ford
- Frederic Forrest
- Robert Forster
- Jodie Foster
- Redd Foxx
- Anthony Franciosa
- Morgan Freeman
- James Garner
- Richard Gere
- Henry Gibson
- Terry Gilliam
- Louis Gossett Jr.
- Elliott Gould
- Pam Grier
- Merv Griffin
- Robert Guillaume
- Alec Guinness
- Gene Hackman
- Larry Hagman
- Mark Hamill
- Valerie Harper
- Richard Harris
- Goldie Hawn
- Katherine Helmond
- Sherman Hemsley
- Florence Henderson
- Jim Henson
- Charlton Heston
- Dustin Hoffman
- Paul Hogan
- Hal Holbrook
- William Holden
- Ian Holm
- James Hong
- Anthony Hopkins
- Dennis Hopper
- Ron Howard
- Susan Howard
- Rock Hudson
- John Hurt
- Eric Idle
- Glenda Jackson
- Kate Jackson
- Olivia Newton-John
- James Earl Jones
- Shirley Jones
- Terry Jones
- Madeline Kahn
- Carol Kane
- Gabe Kaplan
- Casey Kasem
- Julie Kavner
- Stacy Keach
- Diane Keaton
- Harvey Keitel
- Sally Kellerman
- George Kennedy
- Margot Kidder
- Richard Kiel
- Sally Kirkland
- Jack Klugman
- Don Knotts
- Yaphet Kotto
- Kris Kristofferson
- Cheryl Ladd
- Burt Lancaster
- Martin Landau
- Michael Landon
- Vicki Lawrence
- George Lazenby
- Cloris Leachman
- Bruce Lee
- Christopher Lee
- Jack Lemmon
- Jerry Lewis
- Hal Linden
- Christopher Lloyd
- Jack Lord
- Sophia Loren
- Shirley MacLaine
- Gavin MacLeod
- Lee Majors
- Ann-Margret
- Penny Marshall
- Dean Martin
- Steve Martin
- Lee Marvin
- James Mason
- Marcello Mastroianni
- Walter Matthau
- Rue McClanahan
- Roddy McDowall
- Malcolm McDowell
- Steve McQueen
- Ian McShane
- Burgess Meredith
- Lee Meriwether
- Liza Minnelli
- Ricardo Montalbán
- Roger Moore
- Mary Tyler Moore
- Jeanne Moreau
- Rita Moreno
- Harry Morgan
- Pat Morita
- Bob Newhart
- Paul Newman
- Olivia Newton-John
- Jack Nicholson
- Leslie Nielsen
- Nick Nolte
- Chuck Norris
- Carroll O'Connor
- Ryan O'Neal
- Jennifer O'Neill
- Peter O'Toole
- Al Pacino
- Michael Palin
- Jack Palance
- Gregory Peck
- Anthony Perkins
- Jon Pertwee
- Mackenzie Phillips
- Michelle Phillips
- Donald Pleasence
- Suzanne Pleshette
- Christopher Plummer
- Sidney Poitier
- Richard Pryor
- Randy Quaid
- Anthony Quinn
- Gilda Radner
- Tony Randall
- Robert Redford
- Vanessa Redgrave
- Robert Reed
- Christopher Reeve
- Rob Reiner
- Burt Reynolds
- Don Rickles
- John Ritter
- Joan Rivers
- Jason Robards
- Cliff Robertson
- Richard Roundtree
- Marion Ross
- Kurt Russell
- Isabel Sanford
- Susan Sarandon
- John Savage
- Telly Savalas
- John Saxon
- Roy Scheider
- Maximilian Schell
- Arnold Schwarzenegger
- George C. Scott
- Jean Seberg
- George Segal
- Peter Sellers
- Jane Seymour
- Omar Sharif
- William Shatner
- Robert Shaw
- Martin Sheen
- Cybill Shepherd
- Talia Shire
- Tom Skerritt
- Jaclyn Smith
- Suzanne Somers
- Sissy Spacek
- Joe Spinell
- Robert Stack
- Sylvester Stallone
- Terence Stamp
- Harry Dean Stanton
- Susan Strasberg
- Jean Stapleton
- Dean Stockwell
- Meryl Streep
- Barbra Streisand
- Sally Struthers
- Donald Sutherland
- Loretta Swit
- Max von Sydow
- Elizabeth Taylor
- Richard Thomas
- Lily Tomlin
- Rip Torn
- John Travolta
- Jean-Louis Trintignant
- Cicely Tyson
- Liv Ullmann
- Dick Van Dyke
- Robert Vaughn
- Hervé Villechaize
- Jon Voight
- Lindsay Wagner
- Robert Wagner
- Ralph Waite
- Christopher Walken
- Eli Wallach
- M. Emmet Walsh
- Jack Warden
- Sam Waterston
- John Wayne
- Carl Weathers
- Raquel Welch
- Betty White
- Gene Wilder
- Cindy Williams
- Billy Dee Williams
- Robin Williams
- Treat Williams
- Fred Williamson
- Demond Wilson
- Paul Winfield
- Henry Winkler
- Jonathan Winters
- Shelley Winters
- Joanne Woodward
- James Woods
- Bolo Yeung
- Michael York
- Burt Young
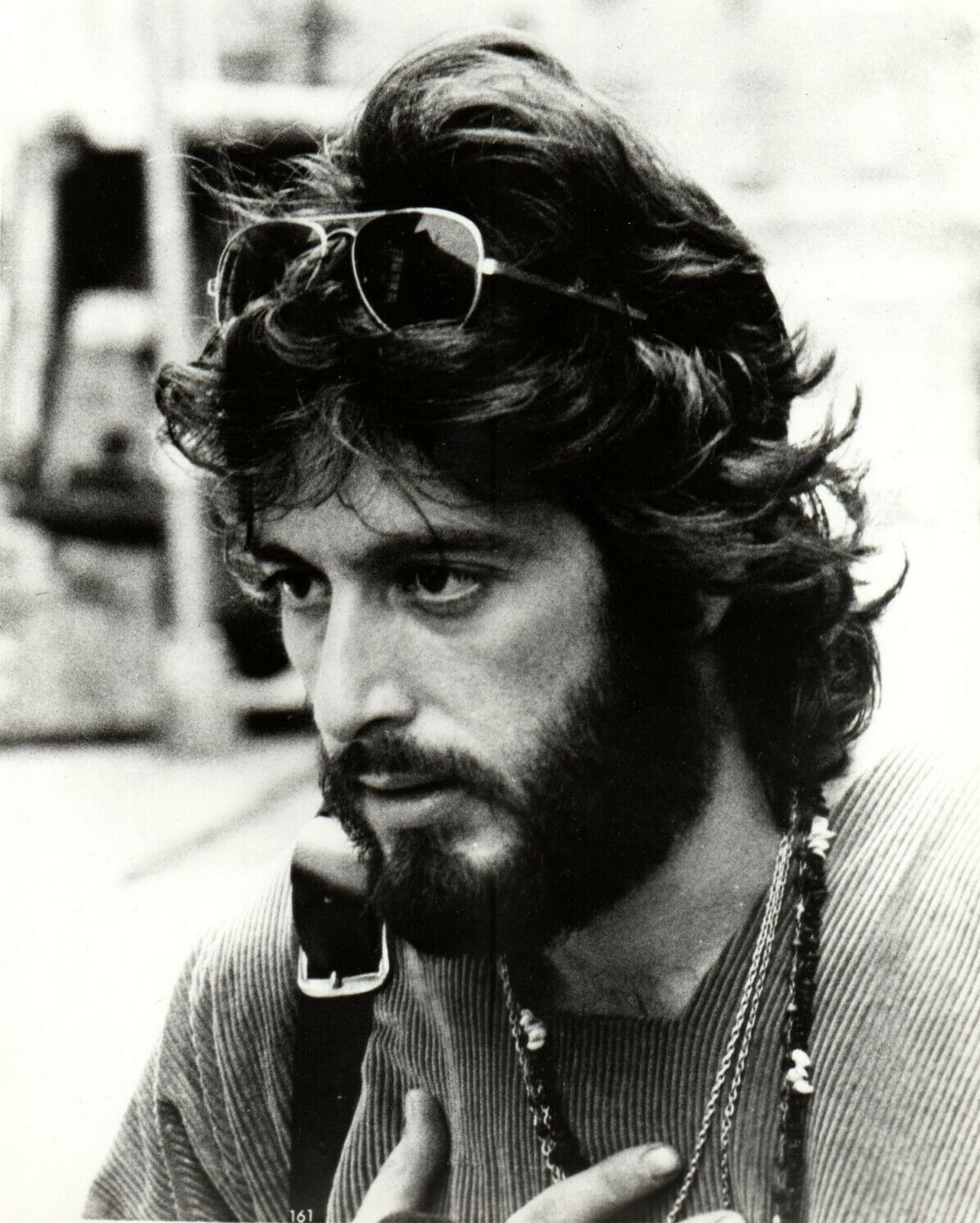
Al Pacino

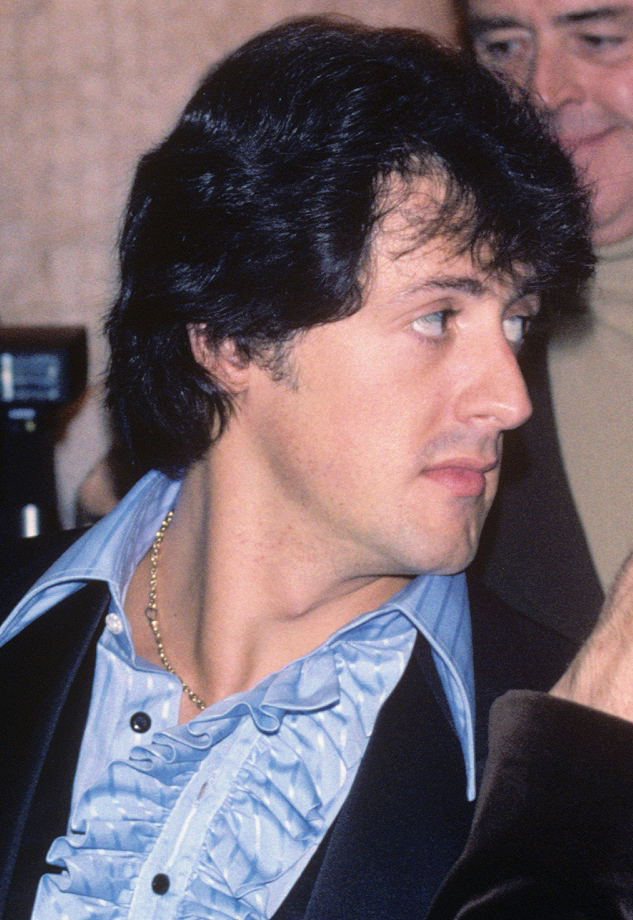
Sylvester Stallone

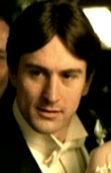
Robert De Niro

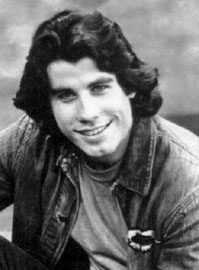
John Travolta

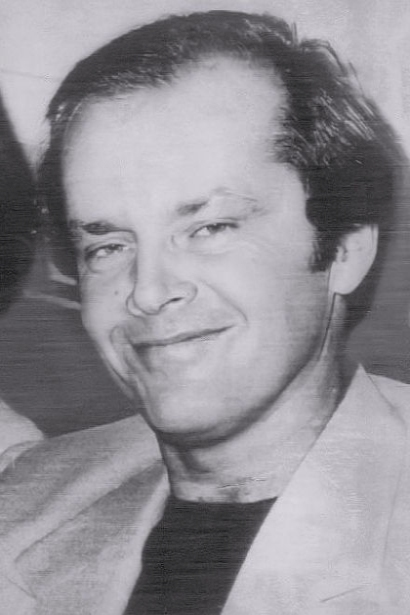
Jack Nicholson

=== Filmmakers ===
- Sylvester Stallone
- Lo Wei
- Woody Allen
- Robert Altman
- Michelangelo Antonioni
- Dario Argento
- Ingmar Bergman
- Bernardo Bertolucci
- John Boorman
- Luis Buñuel
- Michael Cimino
- Jack Clayton
- Francis Ford Coppola
- John Carpenter
- Richard Donner
- Clint Eastwood
- Richard Fleischer
- Miloš Forman
- Bob Fosse
- William Friedkin
- Ridley Scott
- Steven Spielberg
- Martin Scorsese
- Stanley Kubrick
- Joseph L. Mankiewicz
- George Lucas
- Akira Kurosawa
- Brian De Palma
- Roman Polanski
- Sergio Leone
- Terry Gilliam
- Werner Herzog
- Sidney Lumet
- Andreï Tarkovsky
- Arthur Penn
- Alan Parker
- Terrence Malick
- Tobe Hooper
- John Huston
- Ettore Scola
- David Lean
- Sam Peckinpah
- Tonino Valerii
- François Truffaut
- Pier Paolo Pasolini
- Don Siegel
- Dalton Trumbo
- Luchino Visconti
- David Lynch
- Frederico Fellini
- George A. Romero
- Sydney Pollack
- Alan J. Pakula
- John Schlesinger
- Alfred Hitchcock
- George Miller
- Bob Rafelson
- Alejandro Jodorowsky
- Franklin J. Schaffner
- Costa-Gavras
- Elia Kazan
- Norman Jewison
- Peter Weir
- Melvin Van Peebles
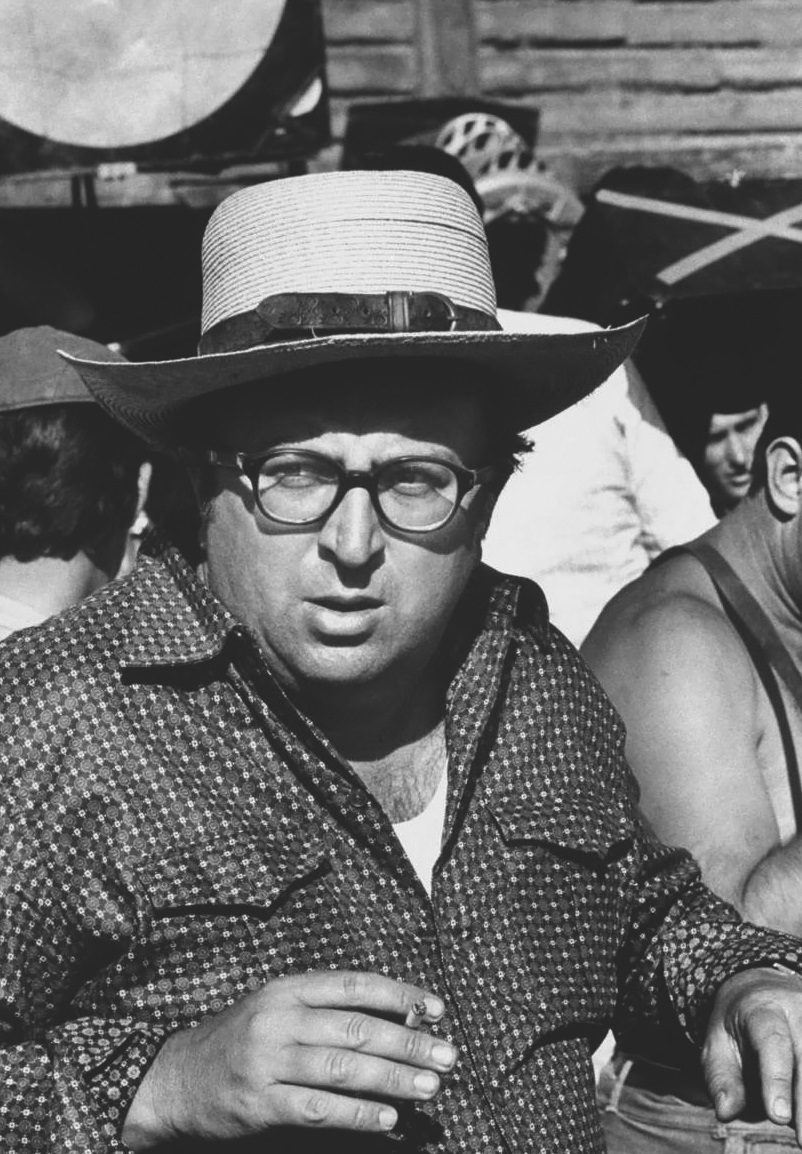
Sergio Leone

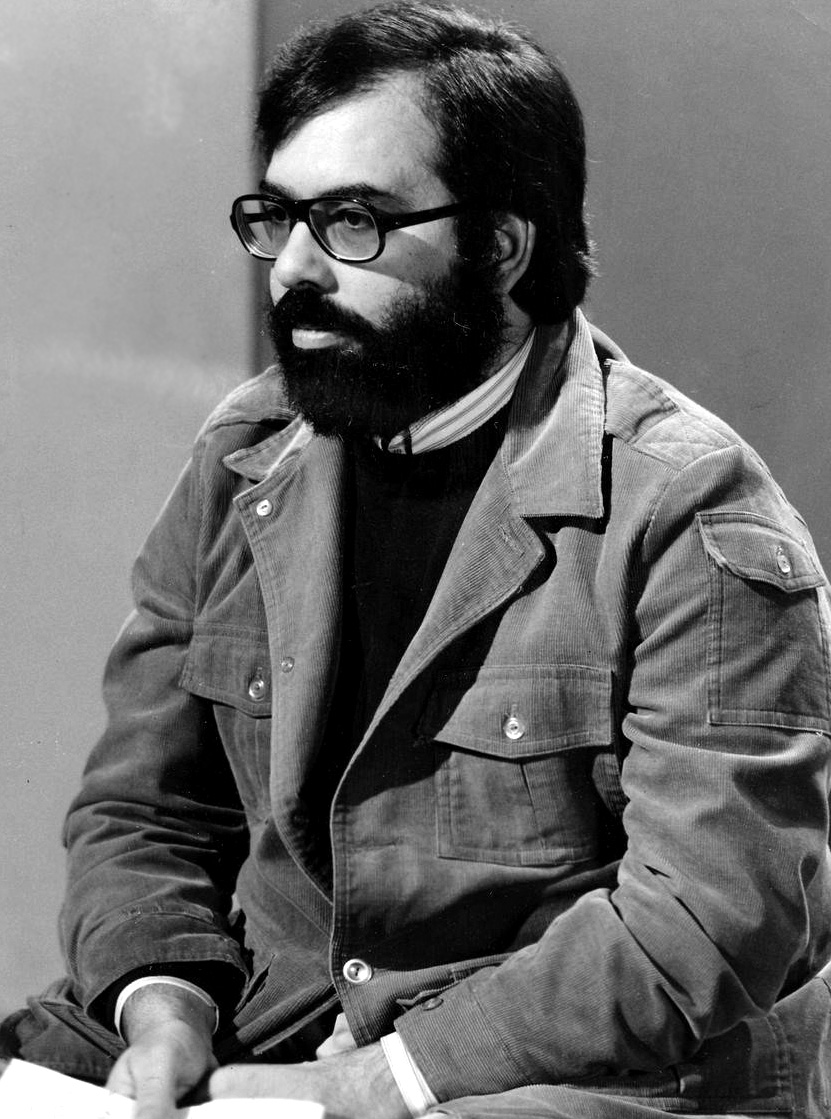
Francis Ford Coppola

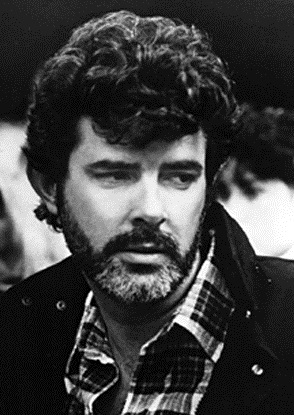
George Lucas

=== Musicians ===
- Bill Anderson
- Lynn Anderson
- Paul Anka
- Chet Atkins
- Joan Baez
- Jeff Beck
- Captain Beefheart
- Tony Bennett
- George Benson
- Bobby Bland
- Marc Bolan
- Pat Boone
- David Bowie
- James Brown
- Jackson Browne
- Peabo Bryson
- Jimmy Buffett
- Eric Burdon
- Jerry Butler
- Glen Campbell
- John Cale
- Johnny Cash
- David Cassidy
- Harry Chapin
- Ray Charles
- Sonny & Cher
- Lou Christie
- Eric Clapton
- Roy Clark
- Joe Cocker
- David Allan Coe
- Leonard Cohen
- Rita Coolidge
- Alice Cooper
- Elvis Costello
- Jim Croce
- David Crosby
- Roger Daltrey
- Charlie Daniels
- Bobby Darin
- Miles Davis
- John Denver
- Neil Diamond
- Nick Drake
- George Duke
- Bob Dylan
- Donovan
- Peter Frampton
- Bryan Ferry
- Roberta Flack
- Aretha Franklin
- Rory Gallagher
- Marvin Gaye
- Crystal Gayle
- Dizzy Gillespie
- Mickey Gilley
- Eddy Grant
- Al Green
- Simon & Garfunkel
- Hall & Oates
- Merle Haggard
- Johnny Hallyday
- George Harrison
- Emmylou Harris
- Isaac Hayes
- Jimi Hendrix
- Wanda Jackson
- Etta James
- Rick James
- Sonny James
- Al Jarreau
- Waylon Jennings
- Billy Joel
- Elton John
- Janis Joplin
- George Jones
- Quincy Jones
- Tom Jones
- B.B. King
- Ben E. King
- Carole King
- Kris Kristofferson
- Patti LaBelle
- Brenda Lee
- Jerry Lee Lewis
- John Lennon
- Gordon Lightfoot
- Meat Loaf
- Kenny Loggins
- Loretta Lynn
- Barbara Mandrell
- Barry Manilow
- Bob Marley
- Johnny Mathis
- Curtis Mayfield
- John Mayall
- Paul McCartney
- Don McLean
- Bette Midler
- Roger Miller
- Ronnie Milsap
- Charles Mingus
- Joni Mitchell
- Eddie Money
- Van Morrison
- Anne Murray
- Johnny Nash
- Willie Nelson
- Olivia Newton-John
- Harry Nilsson
- Ted Nugent
- Yoko Ono
- Roy Orbison
- Buck Owens
- Gilbert O'Sullivan
- Robert Palmer
- Dolly Parton
- Johnny Paycheck
- Teddy Pendergrass
- Wilson Pickett
- Iggy Pop
- Elvis Presley
- Billy Preston
- Ray Price
- Charley Pride
- Eddie Rabbitt
- Lou Rawls
- Jerry Reed
- Lou Reed
- Helen Reddy
- Charlie Rich
- Cliff Richard
- Little Richard
- Jeannie C. Riley
- Smokey Robinson
- Marty Robbins
- Kenny Rogers
- Linda Ronstadt
- Diana Ross
- Leon Russell
- Carlos Santana
- Leo Sayer
- Jeannie Seely
- Neil Sedaka
- Bob Seger
- Carly Simon
- Paul Simon
- Nina Simone
- Nancy Sinatra
- Connie Smith
- Patti Smith
- Ringo Starr
- Rod Stewart
- Cat Stevens
- Barbra Streisand
- Bruce Springsteen
- Dusty Springfield
- Rick Springfield
- Donna Summer
- James Taylor
- Captain & Tennille
- Ike & Tina Turner
- Mel Tillis
- Peter Tosh
- Conway Twitty
- Luther Vandross
- Porter Wagoner
- Dionne Warwick
- Dottie West
- Barry White
- Bill Withers
- Andy Williams
- Don Williams
- Nancy Wilson
- Johnny Winter
- Bobby Womack
- Stevie Wonder
- Gary Wright
- Tammy Wynette
- Faron Young
- Neil Young
- Frank Zappa
- Marc Bolan
- Cher
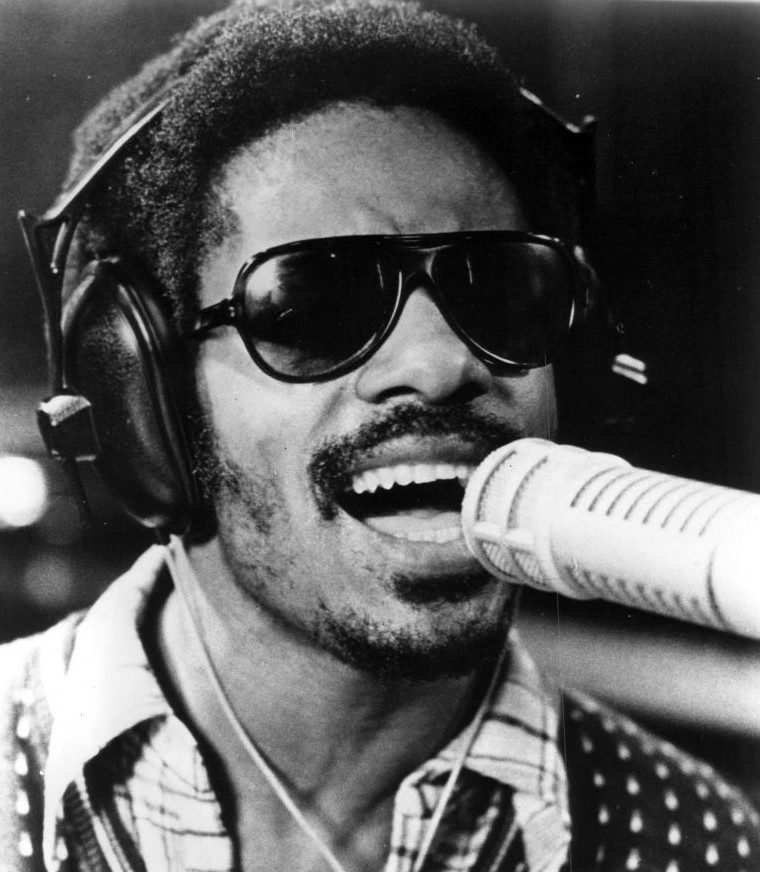
Stevie Wonder, 1973

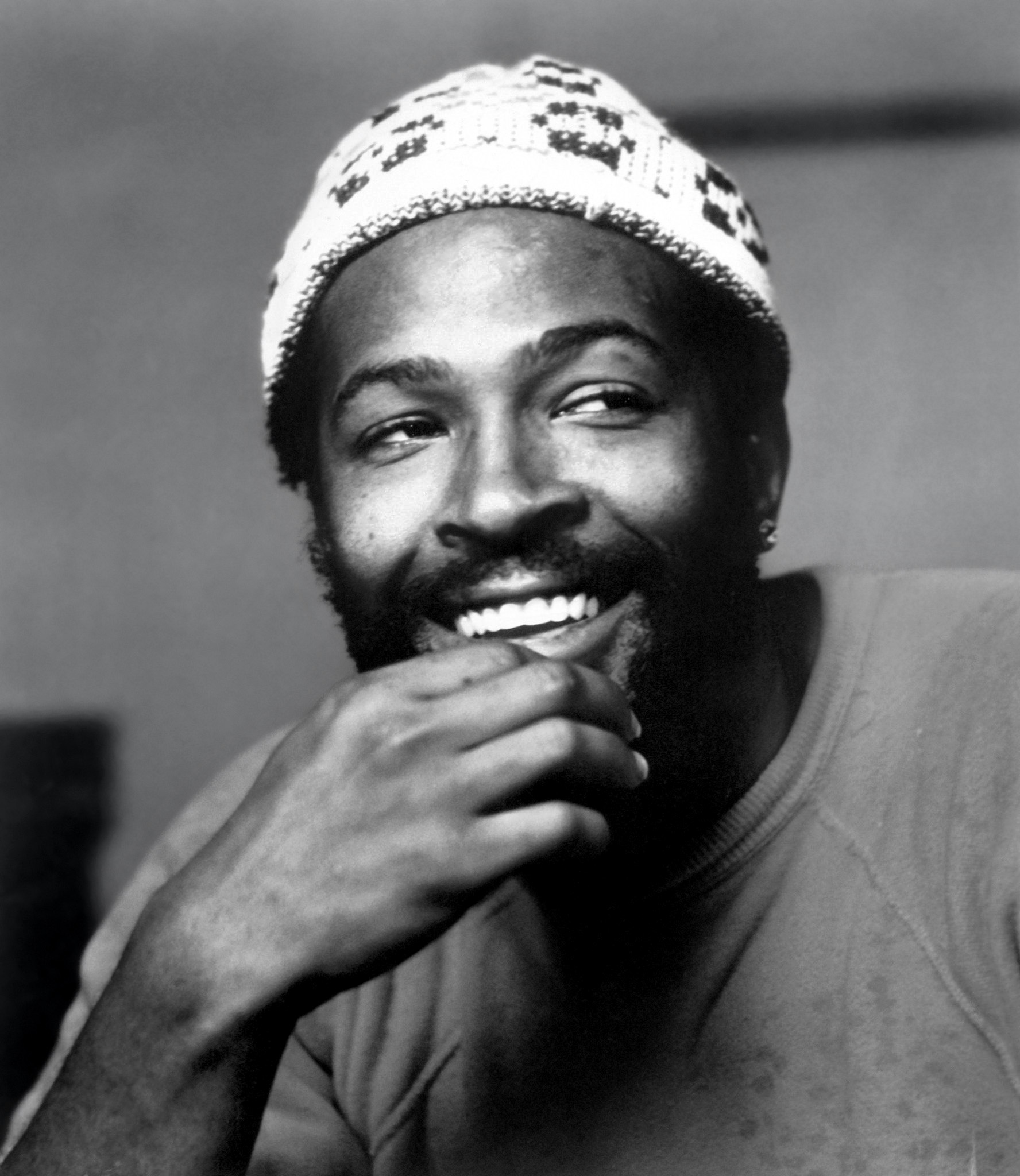
Marvin Gaye, 1973

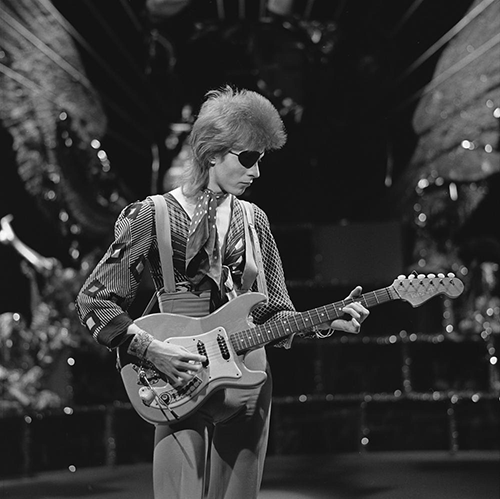
David Bowie, 1975

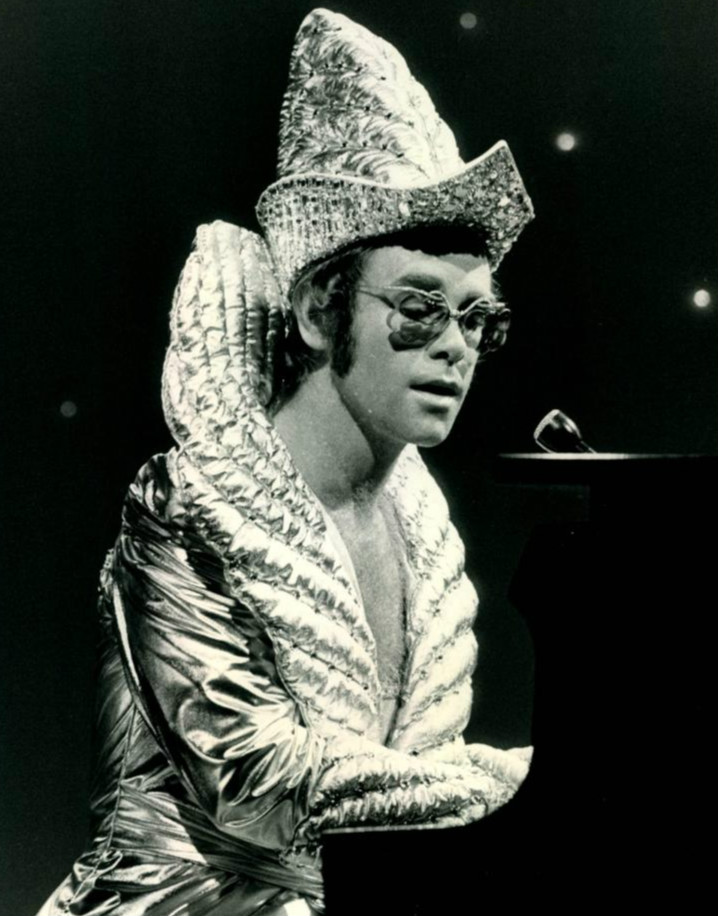
Elton John, 1975

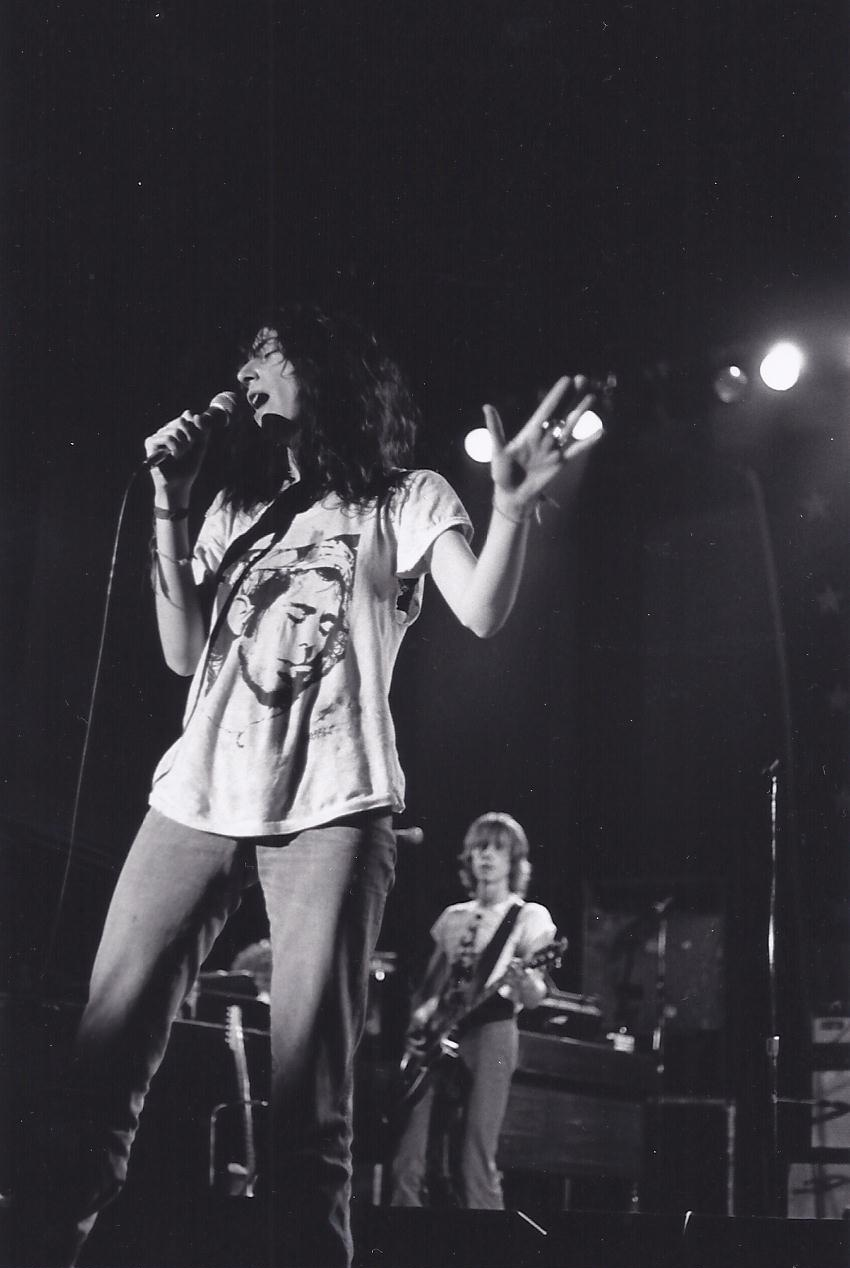
Patti Smith, 1978

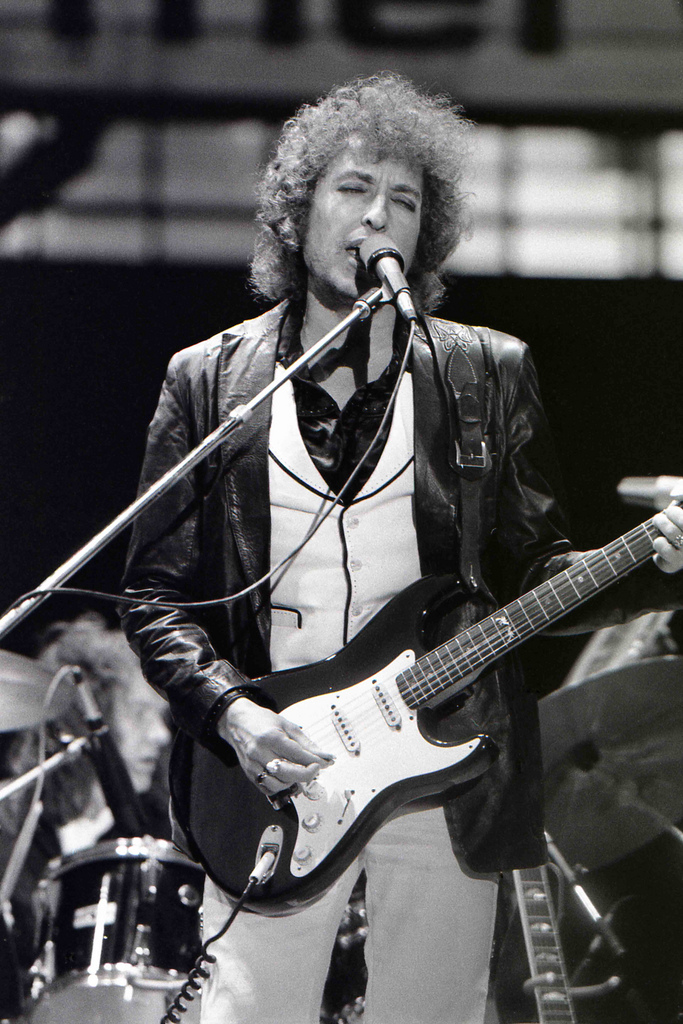
Bob Dylan, 1978

=== Bands ===
- ABBA
- AC/DC
- Aerosmith
- The Allman Brothers Band
- America
- Aphrodite's Child
- The B-52's
- The Band
- Bay City Rollers
- The Beach Boys
- Bee Gees
- The Bellamy Brothers
- Black Sabbath
- Blondie
- Blue Öyster Cult
- Boston
- Bread
- The Byrds
- The Cars
- Chicago
- The Clash
- Commodores
- Creedence Clearwater Revival
- Crosby, Stills, Nash & Young
- Deep Purple
- Devo
- Dire Straits
- The Doobie Brothers
- The Doors
- Dr. Hook & the Medicine Show
- Eagles
- Earth, Wind & Fire
- Electric Light Orchestra
- Emerson, Lake & Palmer
- Fleetwood Mac
- Foreigner
- Genesis
- Grateful Dead
- Heart
- The Hollies
- The Jackson 5
- The Jam
- Jefferson Starship
- Jethro Tull
- Journey
- Kansas
- The Kinks
- Kiss
- Gladys Knight & the Pips
- Kool & the Gang
- Kraftwerk
- King Crimson
- Led Zeppelin
- Lynyrd Skynyrd
- The Marshall Tucker Band
- Paul McCartney and Wings
- MFSB
- Motörhead
- New York Dolls
- The Oak Ridge Boys
- Plastic Ono Band
- The Osmonds
- The Alan Parsons Project
- Tom Petty and the Heartbreakers
- Tony Orlando and Dawn
- Premiata Forneria Marconi
- Pink Floyd
- The Police
- Queen
- Rainbow
- Ramones
- REO Speedwagon
- T. Rex
- The Rolling Stones
- Rush
- Seals & Crofts
- Sex Pistols
- Sly and the Family Stone
- The Staple Singers
- The Statler Brothers
- Status Quo
- Steve Miller Band
- Styx
- Supertramp
- The Supremes
- Talking Heads
- The Temptations
- The Tubes
- Thin Lizzy
- Toto
- Van Halen
- Village People
- The Walker Brothers
- The Who
- Yes
- ZZ Top
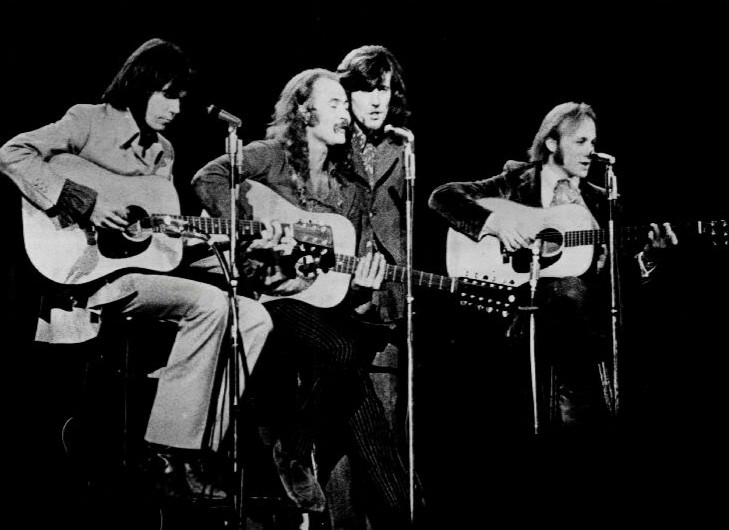
Crosby, Stills, Nash & Young, 1970

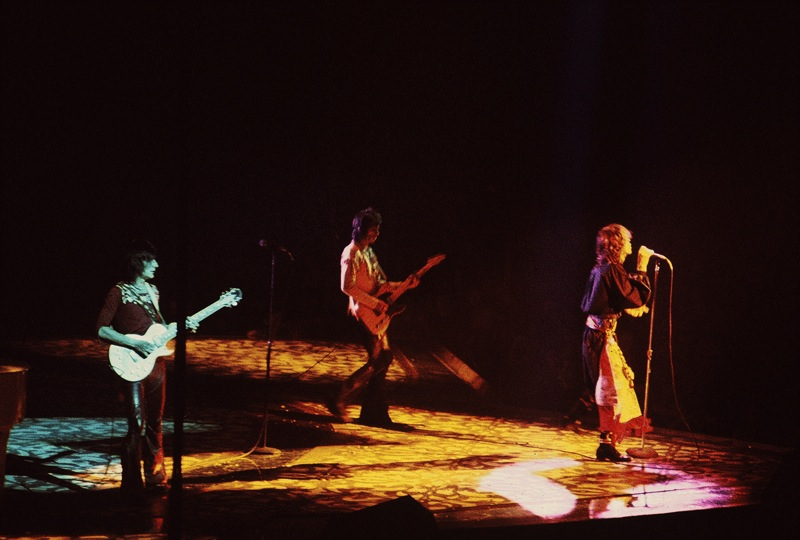
The Rolling Stones, 1975

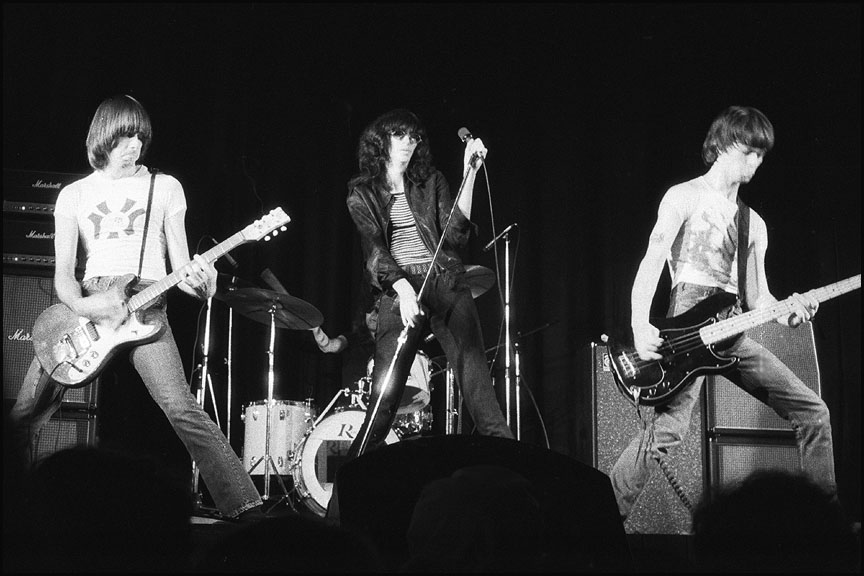
Ramones, 1976

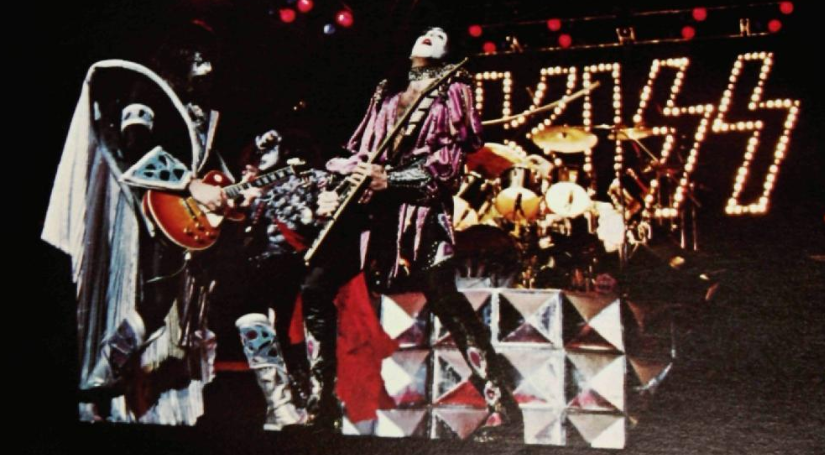
Kiss, 1979

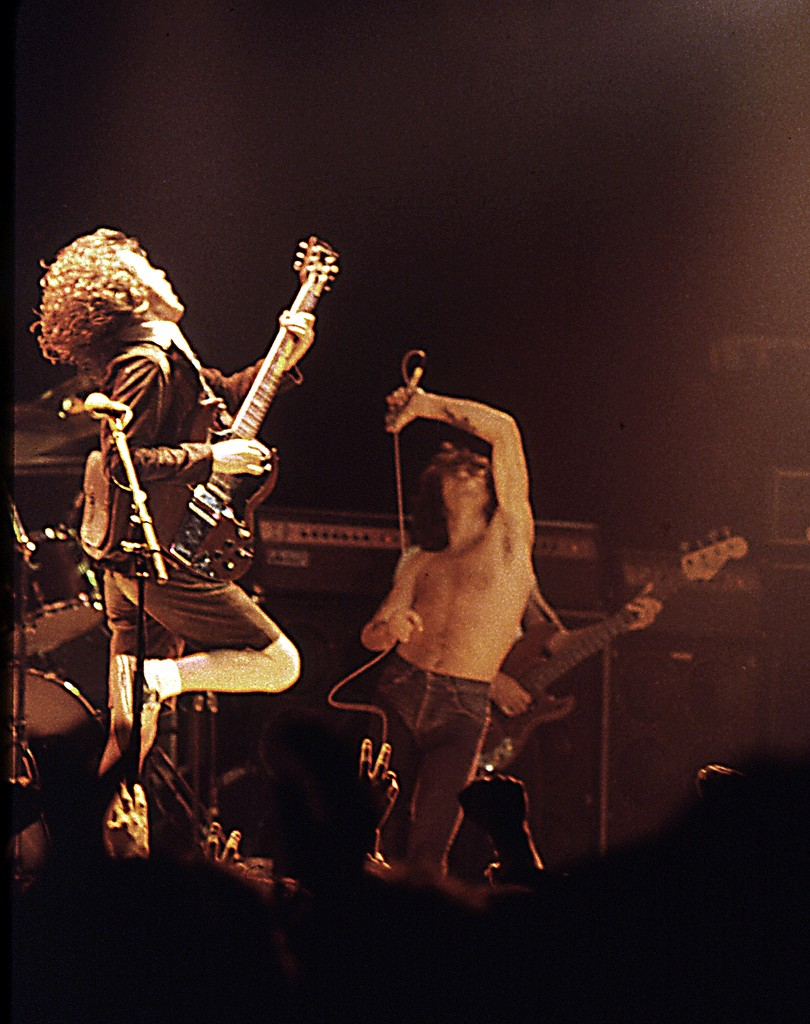
AC/DC, 1979

=== Writers ===
- Douglas Adams
- Maya Angelou
- Isaac Asimov
- James Baldwin
- Amiri Baraka
- Peter Benchley
- Judy Blume
- Jorge Luis Borges
- Ray Bradbury
- André Brink
- Octavia E. Butler
- Anthony Burgess
- John le Carré
- Arthur C. Clarke
- Jackie Collins
- Michael Crichton
- Robertson Davies
- Richard Dawkins
- Samuel R. Delany
- Philip K. Dick
- James Dickey
- E. L. Doctorow
- Oriana Fallaci
- Ken Follett
- Frederick Forsyth
- John Fowles
- Carlos Fuentes
- Eduardo Galeano
- Nikki Giovanni
- William Goldman
- Nadine Gordimer
- Günter Grass
- Ursula K. Le Guin
- Seamus Heaney
- Robert A. Heinlein
- Frank Herbert
- Eleanor Hibbert
- Jack Higgins
- John Irving
- P. D. James
- Ryszard Kapuściński
- Stephen King
- Jack Kirby
- Stan Lee
- Robert Ludlum
- Norman Mailer
- Gabriel García Márquez
- George R. R. Martin
- James A. Michener
- Toni Morrison
- Iris Murdoch
- V. S. Naipaul
- Terry Pratchett
- Mario Puzo
- Thomas Pynchon
- Ruth Rendell
- Harold Robbins
- Philip Roth
- Erich Segal
- Maurice Sendak
- Dr. Seuss
- Irwin Shaw
- Sidney Sheldon
- Josef Škvorecký
- William Styron
- Jacqueline Susann
- Hunter S. Thompson
- John Updike
- Gore Vidal
- Kurt Vonnegut
- Alice Walker
- Tom Wolfe
- Herman Wouk
- Roger Zelazny
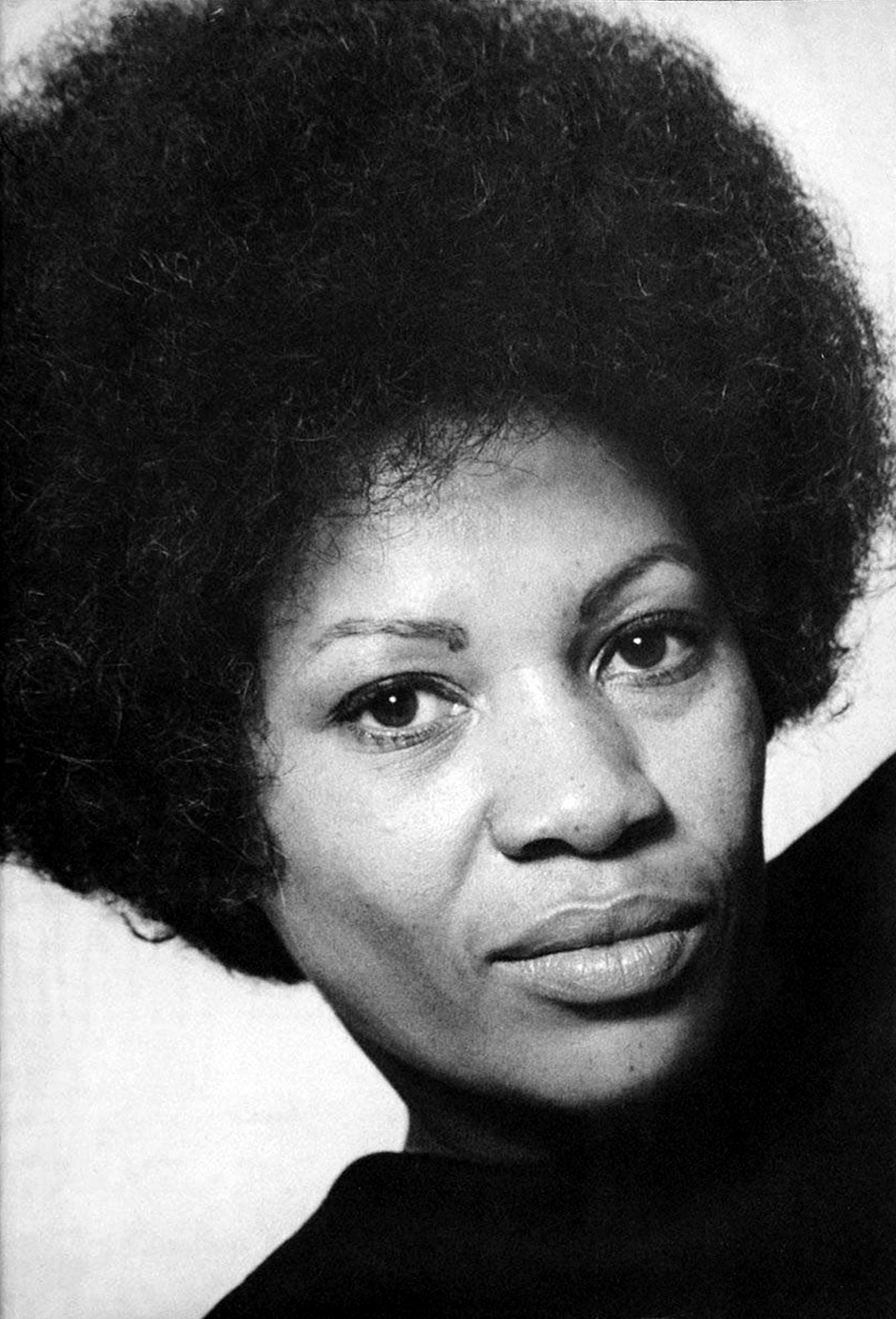
Toni Morrison, 1970

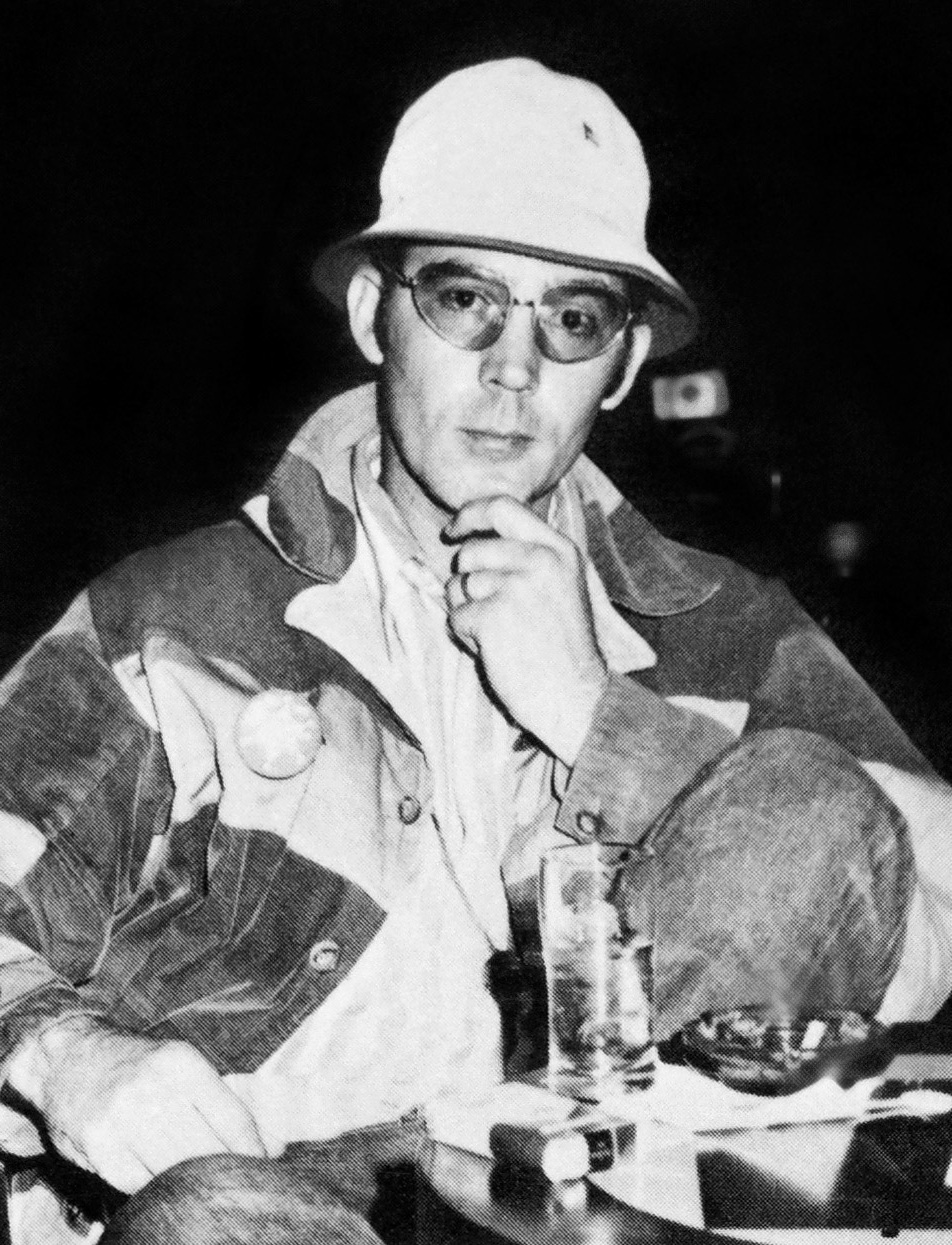
Hunter S. Thompson, 1971

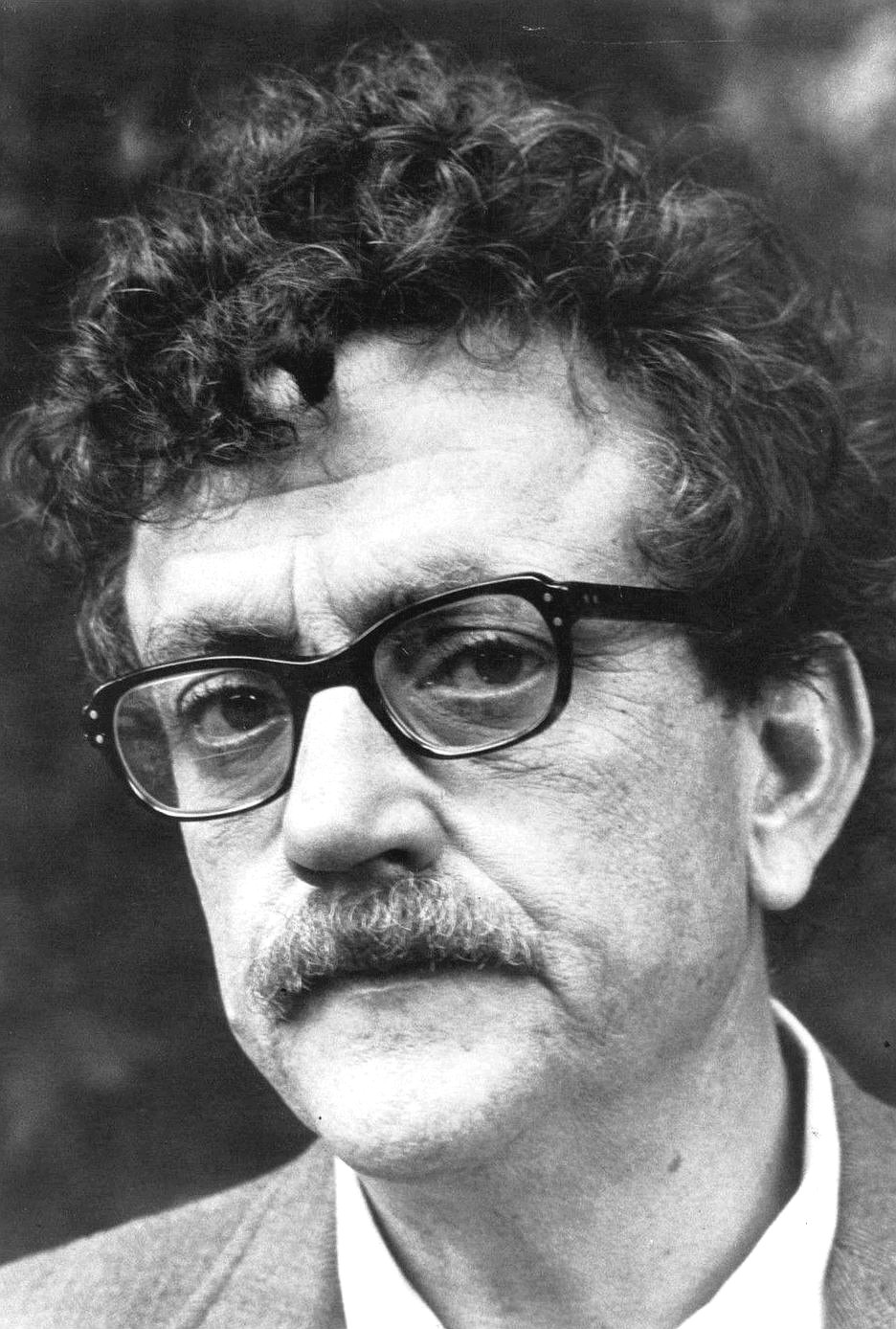
Kurt Vonnegut, 1972

=== Sports figures ===
- André the Giant
- Hank Aaron
- Giacomo Agostini
- Ove Andersson
- Mario Andretti
- Jean-Claude Andruet
- Kareem Abdul-Jabbar
- Carlos Alberto Torres
- Markku Alen
- Bobby Allison
- Muhammad Ali
- Nikolai Andrianov
- Nate Archibald
- Arthur Ashe
- Richard Attwood
- Mykola Avilov
- Gordon Banks
- Rick Barry
- Shirley Babashoff
- Bob Backlund
- Franz Beckenbauer
- Johnny Bench
- Alexander Belov
- Sergey Belov
- Miki Berkovich
- George Best
- Dave Bing
- Björn Borg
- Valeriy Borzov
- Bill Bradley
- Terry Bradshaw
- Lou Brock
- Karin Büttner-Janz
- François Cevert
- Bobby Charlton
- Jack Charlton
- Wilt Chamberlain
- Roger Clark
- Bobby Clarke
- Roberto Clemente
- Nadia Comăneci
- Jimmy Connors
- Roger De Coster
- Hasely Crawford
- Teófilo Cubillas
- Billy Cunningham
- Dave Cowens
- Johan Cruyff
- Larry Csonka
- Kenny Dalglish
- Drazen Dalipagic
- Bernard Darniche
- Dave DeBusschere
- Patrick Depailler
- Eusébio
- Vic Elford
- Roy Emerson
- Julius Erving
- Phil Esposito
- Chris Evert
- Carlton Fisk
- Bobby Fischer
- Emerson Fittipaldi
- Ric Flair
- George Foreman
- Joe Frazier
- Walt Frazier
- Nona Gaprindashvili
- Claudio Gentile
- George Gervin
- Bob Gibson
- Alain Gilles
- Artis Gilmore
- Evonne Goolagong
- Gail Goodrich
- "Superstar" Billy Graham
- Dorothy Hamill
- John Havlicek
- Connie Hawkins
- Bob Hayes
- Elvin Hayes
- Spencer Haywood
- Ottmar Hitzfeld
- Uli Hoeneß
- Larry Holmes
- James Hunt
- Denny Hulme
- Jacky Ickx
- Antonio Inoki
- Dan Issel
- Jean-Pierre Jabouille
- Reggie Jackson
- Jairzinho
- Caitlyn Jenner (then known as Bruce Jenner)
- Alberto Juantorena
- Sawao Katō
- Kevin Keegan
- Kipchoge Keino
- Mario Kempes
- Eizo Kenmotsu
- Billie Jean King
- Olga Korbut
- Guy Lafleur
- Jacques Laffite
- Niki Lauda
- Rod Laver
- Moses Malone
- Pete Maravich
- Roland Matthes
- Ladislao Mazurkiewicz
- Bob McAdoo
- Willie McCovey
- John McEnroe
- Dino Meneghin
- Pietro Mennea
- Eddy Merckx
- Hannu Mikkola
- Heikki Mikkola
- Earl Monroe
- Pedro Morales
- Joe Morgan
- Edwin Moses
- Gerd Müller
- Sandro Munari
- Calvin Murphy
- John Naber
- Akinori Nakayama
- Johan Neeskens
- Jack Nicklaus
- Jean-Pierre Nicolas
- Ángel Nieto
- Chuck Norris
- Ken Norton
- Tom Okker
- Bobby Orr
- Wolfgang Overath
- Carlos Pace
- Arnold Palmer
- Jim Palmer
- Bernie Parent
- Pat Patterson
- Walter Payton
- David Pearson
- Drew Pearson
- Pelé
- Tony Pérez
- Henri Pescarolo
- Ronnie Peterson
- Richard Petty
- Roddy Piper
- Annemarie Moser-Pröll
- Harley Race
- Phil Read
- Brian Redman
- Willis Reed
- Clay Regazzoni
- Peter Revson
- Carlos Reutemann
- Dusty Rhodes
- Rivellino
- Kenny Roberts
- Oscar Robertson
- Frank Robinson
- Larry Robinson
- Pete Rose
- Ken Rosewall
- Nolan Ryan
- Börje Salming
- Bruno Sammartino
- Viktor Saneyev
- Randy Savage
- Jody Scheckter
- Mike Schmidt
- Arnold Schwarzenegger
- Tom Seaver
- Earnie Shavers
- Barry Sheene
- O. J. Simpson
- Jo Siffert
- Stan Smith
- Sócrates
- Leon Spinks
- Mark Spitz
- Ken Stabler
- Willie Stargell
- Roger Staubach
- Jackie Stewart
- Big John Studd
- Lynn Swann
- The Iron Sheik
- Jean-Luc Thérier
- Nate Thurmond
- Ludmilla Tourischeva
- Mitsuo Tsukahara
- Wes Unseld
- Al Unser, Sr.
- Bobby Unser
- Nino Vacarella
- Guillermo Vilas
- Lasse Virén
- Gilles Villeneuve
- Berti Vogts
- Nikolai Volkoff
- Björn Waldegård
- Bill Walton
- Arsène Wenger
- Jerry West
- Paul Westphal
- Jo Jo White
- Jamaal Wilkes
- Lenny Wilkens
- Mac Wilkins
- Dave Winfield
- Cale Yarborough
- Carl Yastrzemski
- Dino Zoff
- Zico
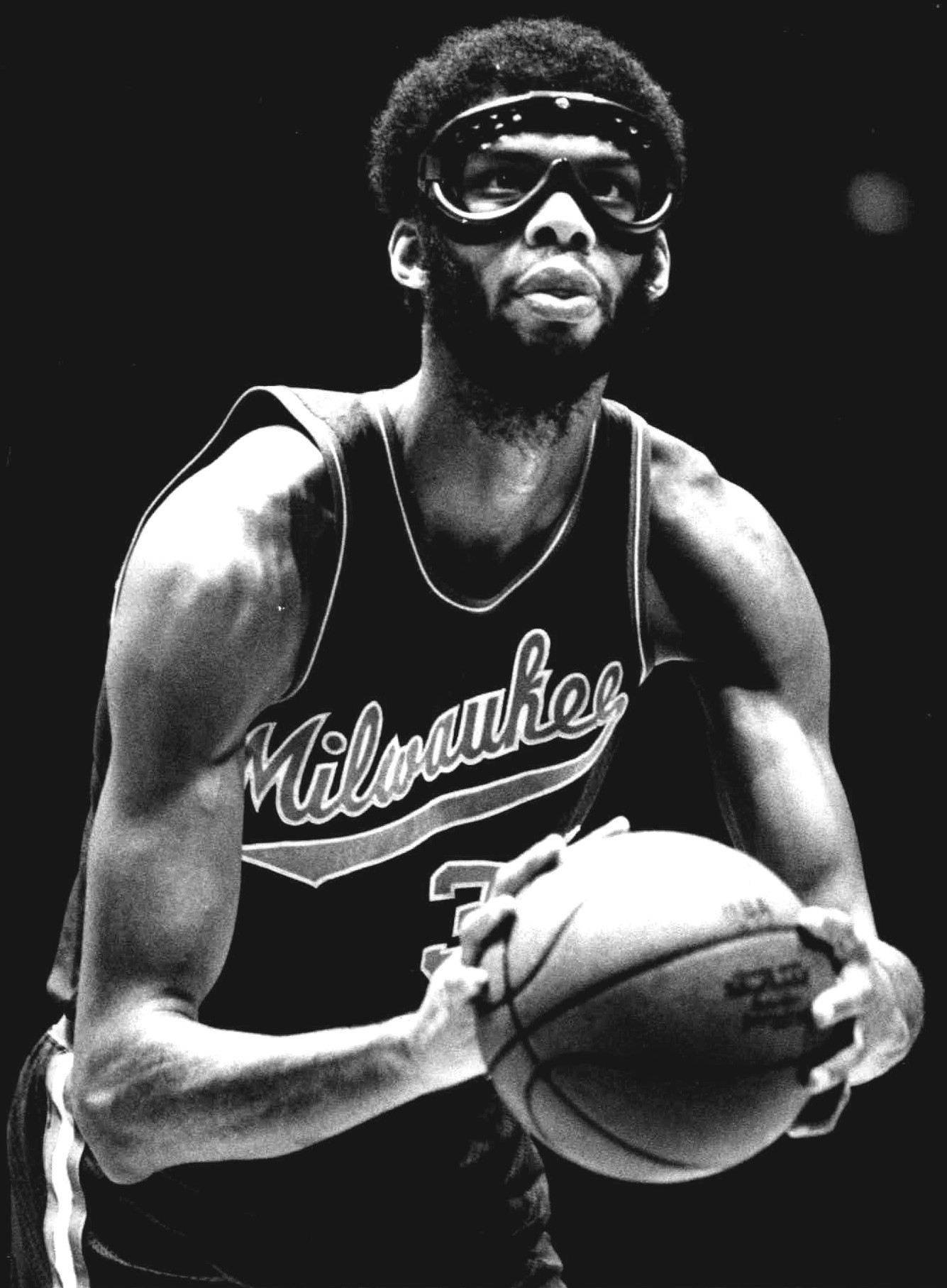
Kareem Abdul-Jabbar, 1974

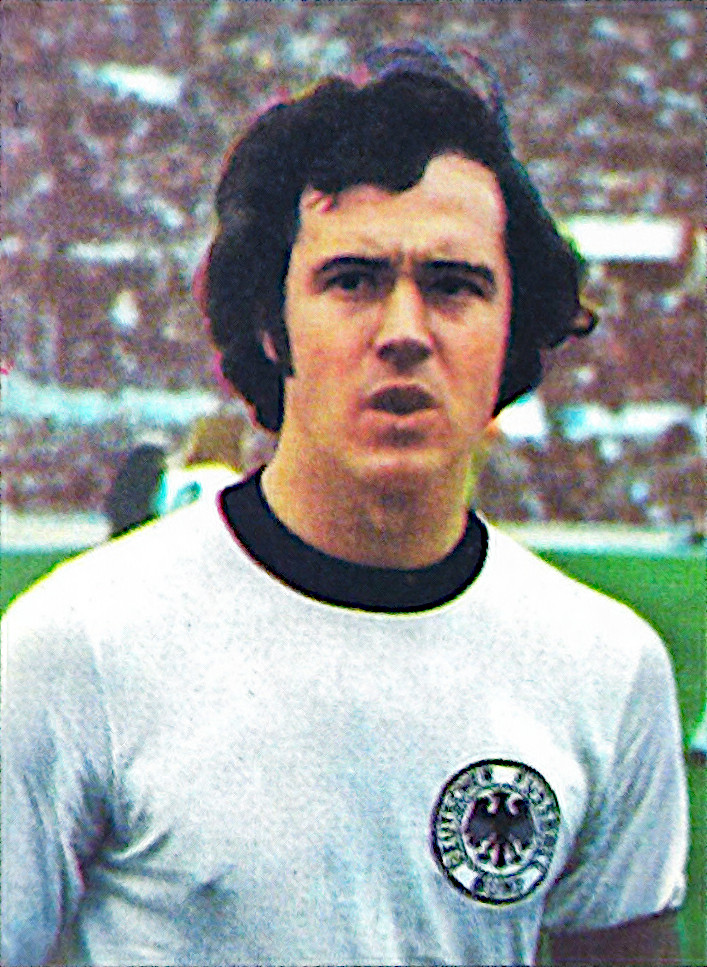
Franz Beckenbauer, 1975

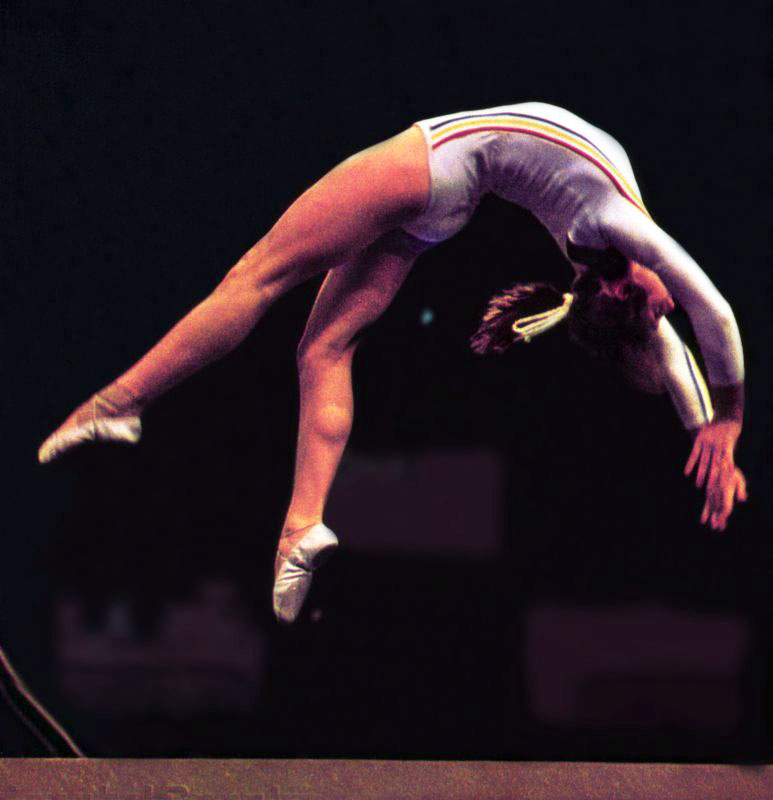
Nadia Comăneci, 1976

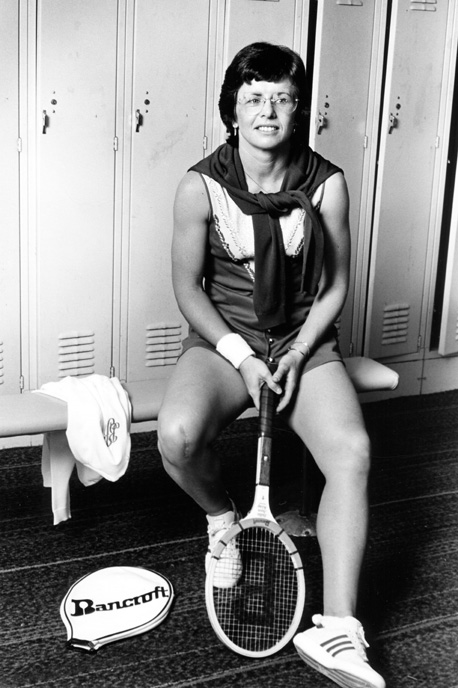
Billie Jean King, 1978

== See also ==
- List of decades, centuries, and millennia
- 1970s in music
- 1970s in fashion
- 1970s in television
- List of years in literature § 1970s
- 1970s nostalgia
- 1970s in video gaming
- 1970s in sports

=== Timeline ===
The following articles contain brief timelines which list the most prominent events of the decade:

1970 • 1971 • 1972 • 1973 • 1974 • 1975 • 1976 • 1977 • 1978 • 1979
