= Vehicle audio =

Entertainment electronics in cars

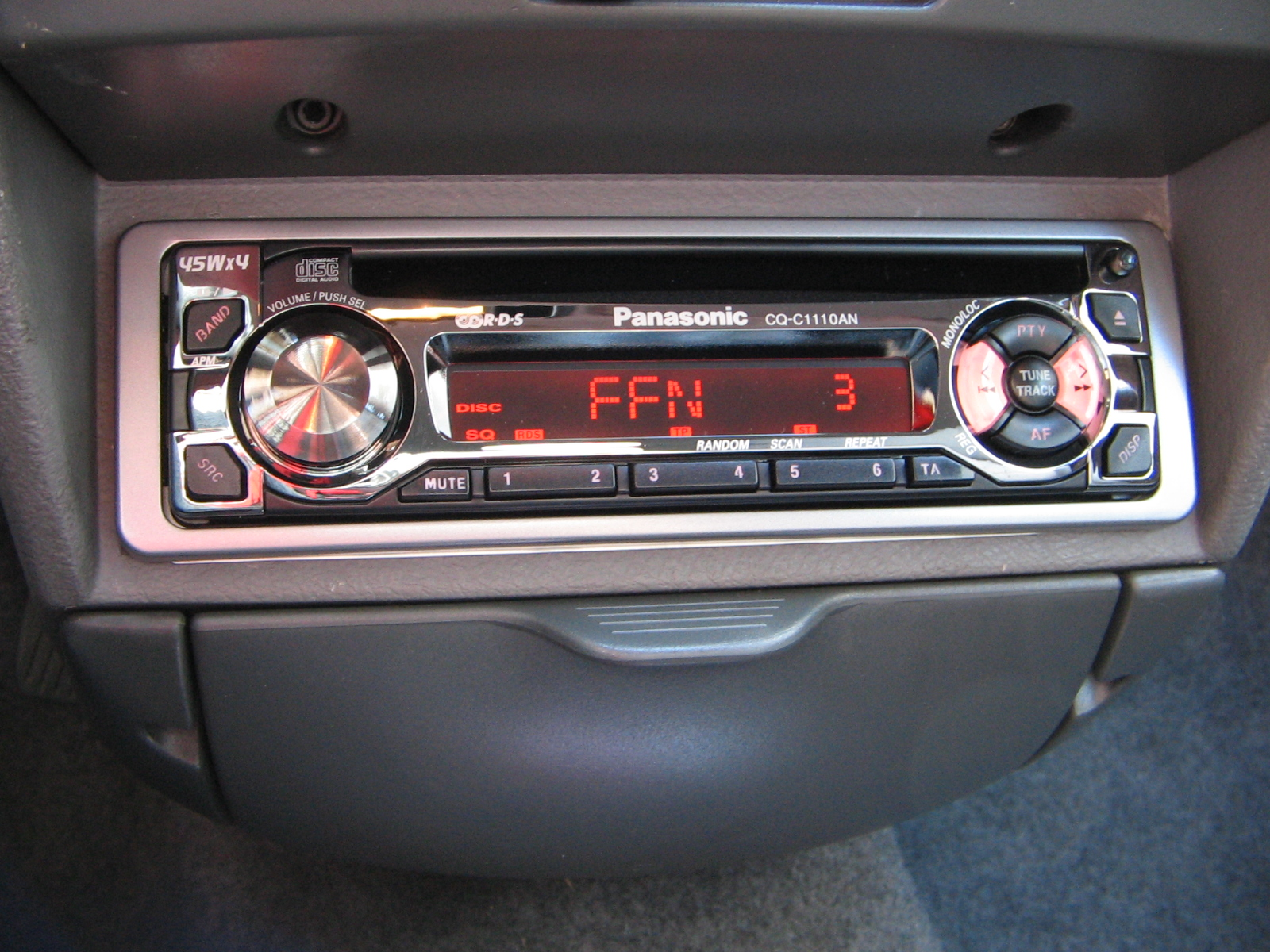
A DIN head unit with a radio and CD player

Vehicle audio, also known as car multimedia, is equipment installed in a car (automobile) or other vehicle to provide in-car entertainment and information for the occupants. Such systems are popularly known as car stereos. Until the 1950s, it consisted of a simple AM radio. Additions since then have included FM radio (1952), 8-track tape players, Cassette decks, record players, CD players, DVD players, Blu-ray players, navigation systems, Bluetooth telephone integration and audio streaming, and smartphone controllers like CarPlay and Android Auto. Once controlled only from the dashboard using a few buttons, today they can be controlled by steering wheel controls and voice commands.

It was initially implemented for listening to music and radio but vehicle audio is now part of car telematics, telecommunications, in-vehicle security, handsfree calling, navigation, and remote diagnostics systems. The same loudspeakers may also be used to minimize road and engine noise with active noise control, or they can also be used to augment engine sounds, for example, making a small engine sound bigger. Vehicle audio systems have begun to move to digital platforms using bus networks and optical cables for signal transfer rather than traditional analog cables.

== History ==
=== Radio ===
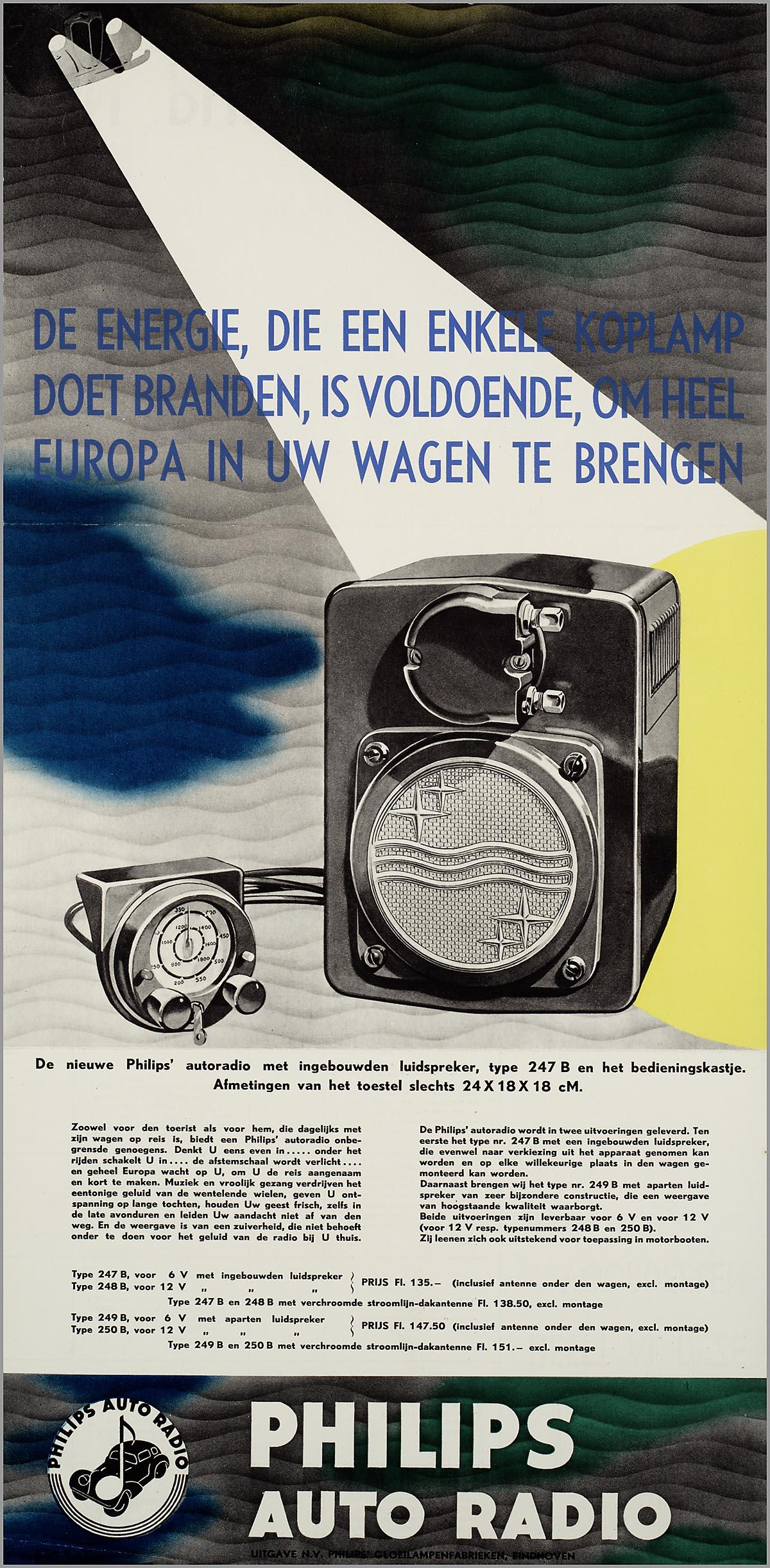
1937 Philips Auto Radio. Weighing 24 kg and taking 8 litres of space, it was floor mounted with a wired remote control to be fitted to the dashboard.

In 1904, before commercially viable technology for mobile radio was in place, American inventor and self-described "Father of Radio" Lee de Forest demonstrated a car radio at the 1904 Louisiana Purchase Exposition in St. Louis.

Around 1920, vacuum tube technology had matured to the point where the availability of radio receivers made radio broadcasting viable. A technical challenge was that the vacuum tubes in the radio receivers required 50 to 250 volt direct current, but car batteries ran at 6V and so radios needed their own separate battery. The breakthrough was finding a way to step up the voltage with a vibrator that provided a pulsating DC which could be converted to a higher voltage with a transformer, rectifier, and filter to create higher-voltage DC.

In 1920 Guglielmo Marconi demonstrated a car wireless receiver in Chelmsford, Essex, England where his company had installed an experimental 6 kW longwave transmitter on 2750 metres (109 kHz).

In 1924, Kelly's Motors in New South Wales, Australia, installed its first car radio.

In 1930, the American Galvin Manufacturing Corporation marketed a Motorola-branded radio receiver for $130. The cost of these early radios was expensive, relative to the price of a car: the contemporary Ford Model A cost about $540. A Plymouth sedan, "wired for Philco Transitone radio without extra cost," was advertised in Ladies' Home Journal in 1931. In 1932 in Germany, the Blaupunkt AS 5 medium wave and longwave radio was marketed for 465 Reichsmark, about one-third of the price of a small car. Because it took nearly 10 litres of space, it could not be located near the driver and was operated via a steering wheel remote control. In 1933, Crossley Motors offered a factory fitted car radio for £35. By the late 1930s, push button AM radios were considered a standard feature. In 1946, there were an estimated 9 million AM car radios in use.

An FM receiver was offered by Blaupunkt in 1952. In 1953, Becker introduced the AM/FM Becker Mexico with a Variometer tuner, basically a station-search or scan function.

In April 1955, the Chrysler Corporation announced that it was offering a Mopar model 914HR branded Philco all-transistor car radio as a $150 option for its 1956 Chrysler and Imperial car models. Chrysler Corporation had decided to discontinue its all-transistor car radio option at the end of 1956, due to it being too expensive, and replaced it with a less expensive hybrid (transistors and low voltage vacuum tubes) car radio for its new 1957 car models. In 1963, Becker introduced the Monte Carlo, a solid state radio with no vacuum tubes.

From 1974 to 2005, the Autofahrer-Rundfunk-Informationssystem was used by the German ARD network. Developed jointly by the Institut für Rundfunktechnik and Blaupunkt, it indicated the presence of traffic announcements through manipulation of the 57 kHz subcarrier of the station's FM signal. ARI was replaced by the Radio Data System.

The AM/FM radio combined with a CD player has remained a mainstay of car audio, despite being obsolescent in non-car applications.

In the 2010s, internet radio, satellite radio, streaming, and podcasting came into competition with AM/FM radio. By this time some models were offering 5.1 surround sound.

In 2023, several automobile manufacturers, including Ford Motor Company, announced plans to discontinue offering the AM radio band in new vehicles, starting with the 2024 model year. Ford later reversed its announcement, with chief executive officer Jim Farley citing the importance of AM's emergency alert system. Audi, BMW, Volvo, and Tesla had already started to not offer the AM band on their entertainment systems, specifically on their electric vehicles. The previous announcement had several lawmakers introduce bipartisan legislation to require that automobile manufacturers include the AM band on their audio/entertainment systems.

=== Physical media and connectivity ===
Mobile players for physical media have been provided for vinyl records, 8-track tapes, cassette tapes, compact discs, and MP3s. The increased sophistication of the vehicle audio system to accommodate such media has made the audio unit a common target of car break-ins, so these are equipped with anti-theft systems too.

Attempts at providing mobile play from media were first made with vinyl records, beginning in the 1950s. The first such player was offered by Chrysler as an option on 1956 Chrysler, Desoto, Dodge, and Plymouth cars. The player was developed by CBS Labs and played a limited selection of specially provided 7-inch (180 mm) discs at 16 2/3 rpm. The unit was an expensive option and was dropped after two years. Less expensive options using commonly available 45 rpm records were made by RCA Victor (available only in 1961) and Norelco. All of these players required extra pressure on the needle to avoid skipping during vehicle movement, which caused accelerated wear on the records.

In 1962, Muntz introduced the Wayfarer 4-track cartridge tape player. Celebrities, including Frank Sinatra, had these units installed in their cars.

In 1965, Ford and Motorola jointly introduced the in-car 8-track tape player as optional equipment for 1966 Ford car models. In 1968, a dashboard car radio with a built-in cassette tape player was introduced by Philips. In subsequent years, cassettes supplanted the 8-track and improved the technology, with longer play times, better tape quality, auto-reverse, and Dolby noise reduction. They were popular throughout the 1970s and 1980s. Cassette players were still found in vehicles as late as the 2005–2006 Honda CR-V and 2008 Acura TL. There have also been vehicle audio units that accept both compact cassettes and CDs. A car cassette adapter allowed motorists to plug in a portable music player (CD player, MP3 player) into an existing installed cassette tape deck. The last new cars in the American market to be factory-equipped with a cassette deck in the dashboard were the 2010 Lexus SC430, and the Ford Crown Victoria.

Pioneer introduced the CDX-1, the first car CD (compact disc) player, in 1984. It was known for its improved sound quality, instant track skipping, and the format's increased durability over cassette tapes. Car CD changers started to gain popularity in the late 1980s and continued throughout the 1990s, with the earlier devices being trunk-mounted and later ones being mounted in the head unit, some able to accommodate six to ten CDs. Stock and aftermarket CD players began appearing in the late 1980s, competing with the cassette. The first automaker to offer a CD player in their cars from the factory was Mercedes, who offered a Becker Mexico radio with an integrated CD player as an option on most of their models starting in either 1985 or 1986. Soon after, Lincoln introduced an OEM CD player in the 1987 Lincoln Town Car, built in collaboration with JBL. 83 percent of new cars sold in North America in 2014 had CD players, falling to 76 percent a year later, with research firm IHS Automotive projecting that 46 percent of cars would lack CD players by 2021. In 2024, only nine new car models in the United States released with CD players, falling to four in 2025 and finally one in 2026: the Subaru WRX.

In the early 21st century, compact digital storage media – Bluetooth-enabled devices, thumb drives, memory cards, and dedicated hard drives – came to be accommodated by vehicle audio systems. Around this time auxiliary input jacks and USB ports were added to connect MP3 players to the vehicle's speakers. Minivans and three-row SUVs have an optional rear entertainment system with a DVD player to entertain passengers.

The automobile head unit became increasingly important as a housing for front and backup dashcams, navis, and operating systems with multiple functions, such as Android Auto, CarPlay and MirrorLink, allowing a smartphone's music library and navigation apps to be controlled via the vehicle's infotainment system. Latest models are equipped with features like Bluetooth technology along with HDMI port for better connectivity. Screen size varies from 5-to-7-inch (130 to 180 mm) for the double Din car stereos.

=== Active noise control and noise synthesis ===
The automobile sound system may be part of an active noise control system which reduces engine and road noise for the driver and passengers. One or more microphones are used to pick up sound from various places on the vehicle, especially the engine compartment, underside, or exhaust pipes, and these signals are handled by a digital signal processor (DSP) and then sent to the loudspeakers in such a way that the processed signal reduces or cancels out the outside noise heard inside the car. An early system focused only on engine noise was developed by Lotus and licensed for the 1992 Nissan Bluebird models sold in Japan. Lotus later teamed with Harman in 2009 to develop a more complete noise reduction system, including road and tire noise as well as chassis vibrations. One benefit of active noise control is that the car can weigh less, with less sound-deadening material used, and without a heavy balance shaft in the engine. Removing the balance shaft also increases fuel efficiency. The 2013 Honda Accord used an active noise control system, as did the 2013 Lincoln luxury line and the Ford C-Max and Fusion models. Other operating data, such as the engine's speed in revolutions per minute (RPM) or the car's highway speed, may also play a part in the DSP. A multiple source reduction system may reach as much as 80% of the noise removed.

The same system may also be used to synthesize or augment engine noise to make the engine sound more powerful to the driver. For the 2015 Ford Mustang EcoBoost Fastback and EcoBoost Fastback Premium, an "Active Noise Control" system was developed that amplifies the engine sound through the car speakers. A similar system is used in the F-150 pickup truck. Volkswagen uses a Soundaktor, a special speaker to play sounds in cars such as the Golf GTi and Beetle Turbo. BMW plays a recorded sample of its motors through the car speakers, using different samples according to the engine's load and power.

== Components and terms ==
The stock system is the OEM application that the vehicle's manufacturer specified to be installed when the car was built.

Aftermarket components can also be used.

- Head unit: Headunit products includes the screen and buttons and are manufactured mainly in DIN form factor, which refers to ISO 7736. Head units come as single DIN or double DIN.
- Connectors for car audio, where ISO 10487 Harness Adapter is used.
- Capacitors.
- Mobile audio power amplifiers.

Amplifiers increase the power level of audio signals. Some head units have built-in stereo amplifiers. Other car audio systems use a separate stand-alone amplifier. Every amplifier has a rated power level sometimes noted on the head unit with the built-in amplifier, or on the label of a stand-alone unit.

1. Coaxial speakers: These are the most common type of car speakers and are often factory-installed. They usually consist of a woofer and a tweeter mounted on the same axis, and are designed to reproduce a wide range of frequencies.
2. Component speakers: These speakers are designed for higher-end car audio systems and typically consist of separate woofers, tweeters, and crossovers. This allows for more precise sound tuning and a higher level of sound quality.
3. Subwoofers: These speakers are designed to reproduce low-frequency sounds, particularly bass. They come in various sizes and power levels, and can be used to enhance the bass in a car audio system.
4. Mid-range speakers: These speakers are designed to reproduce mid-range frequencies, such as vocals and instruments like guitars and pianos.
5. Tweeters: These speakers are designed to reproduce high-frequency treble sounds, such as cymbals and other high-pitched instruments.
6. Sound-deadening material is often used in the door cavities and boot area to dampen excess vibration of the panels in the car in response to loud subwoofer bass tones, especially the boot (trunk).
7. Optical drives with slot-loading mechanism.
8. Digital Sound processors (DSP) enhances or alters the sound signal being reproduced. Primarily used when a system has multiple amplifiers or integrating aftermarket audio products with factory head units.

== Add-ons ==
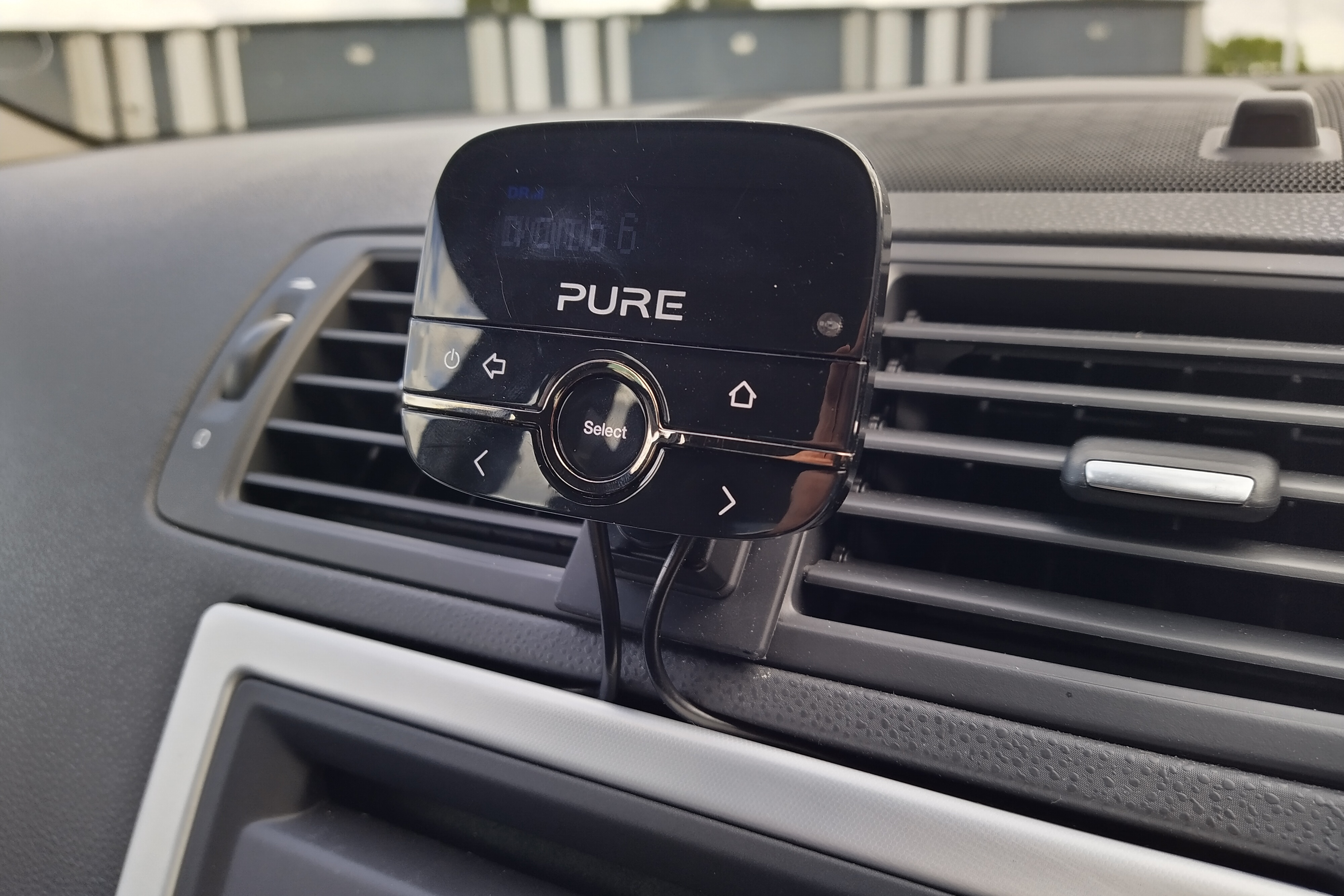
A digital radio adapter add-on for a car, designed for listening to DAB radio broadcasts on vehicles that would otherwise lack the feature

Vehicles can be retrofitted or upgraded with additional, non-fixed audio systems. Personal FM transmitters provide a way of listening to audio output from a device using the car's FM radio. Cassette tape adapters give the ability of an auxiliary input on a car cassette deck, being able to output audio on the car stereo from a smartphone, portable CD player and any other equipment using the standard headphone jack. There also exists cassette adapters that make use of Bluetooth. Older cars that may lack Bluetooth in its stereo unit can also be fitted with a Bluetooth adapter through e.g. the car's cigarette power outlet.

Newer cars that may lack a native CD player may also be upgraded using a portable CD player outputting through the car stereo's auxiliary port, or through Bluetooth or an FM transmitter. Some companies, including car manufacturers, have offered external CD players as add-ons, designed specifically for use in the car.

== Legality ==
According to the non-profit Noise Free America, excessively loud sound systems in automobiles violate the noise ordinance of municipalities, some of which have outlawed them. In 2002, the U.S. Department of Justice issued a guide to police officers on how to deal with problems associated with loud audio systems in cars.

== Gallery ==
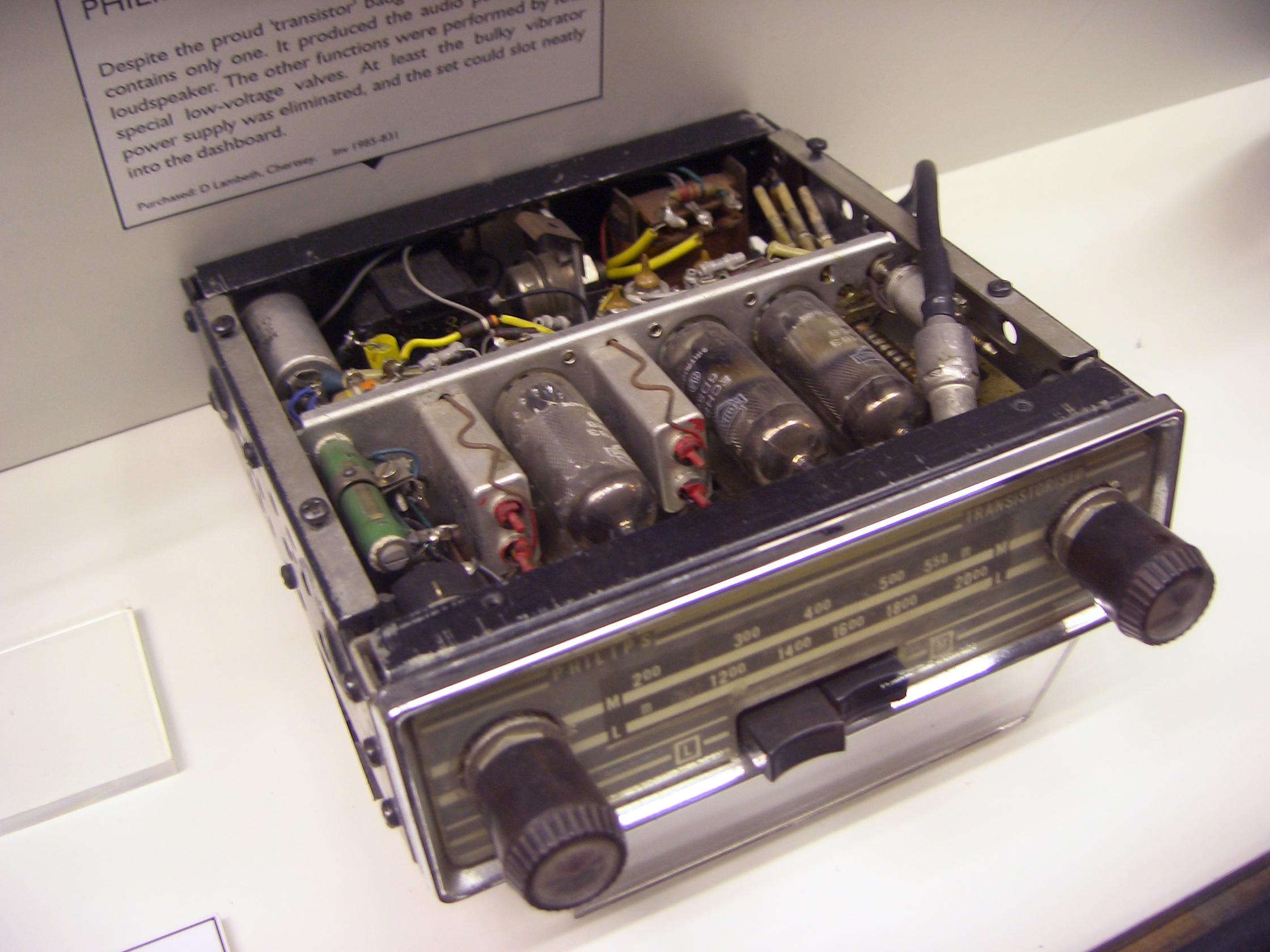
A 1950s Philips car radio using both transistor and valves. This model used a range of valves that only required 12 volts for their plate (anode) voltage.

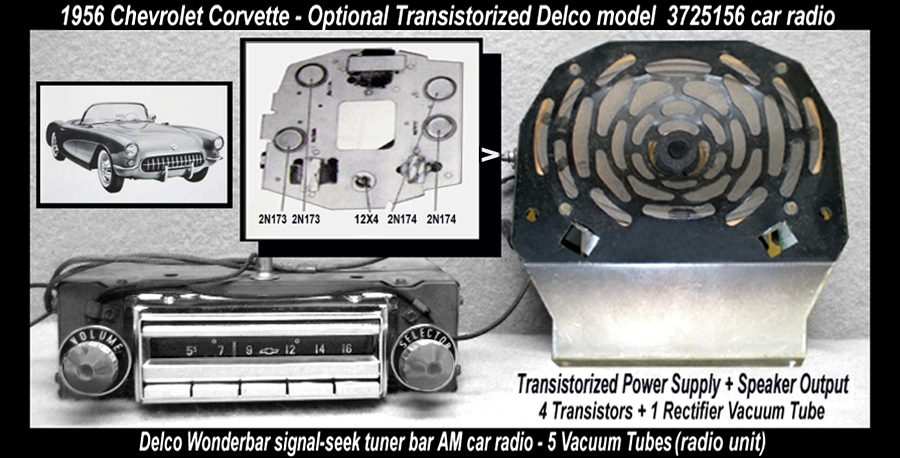
GM Delco Transistorized "Hybrid" (vacuum tubes and transistors), first offered as an option on the 1956 Chevrolet Corvette car models

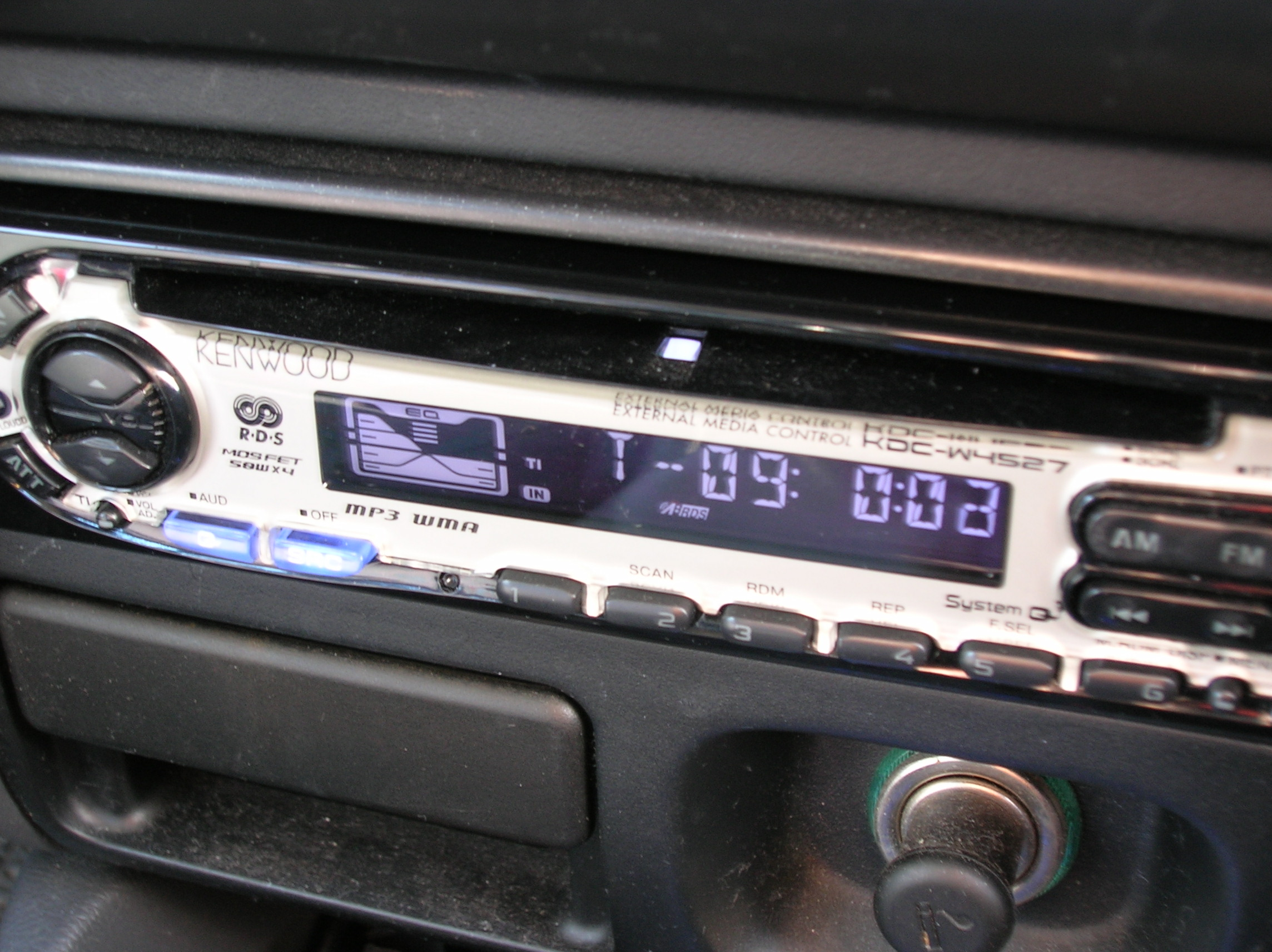
A car stereo head unit in a dashboard

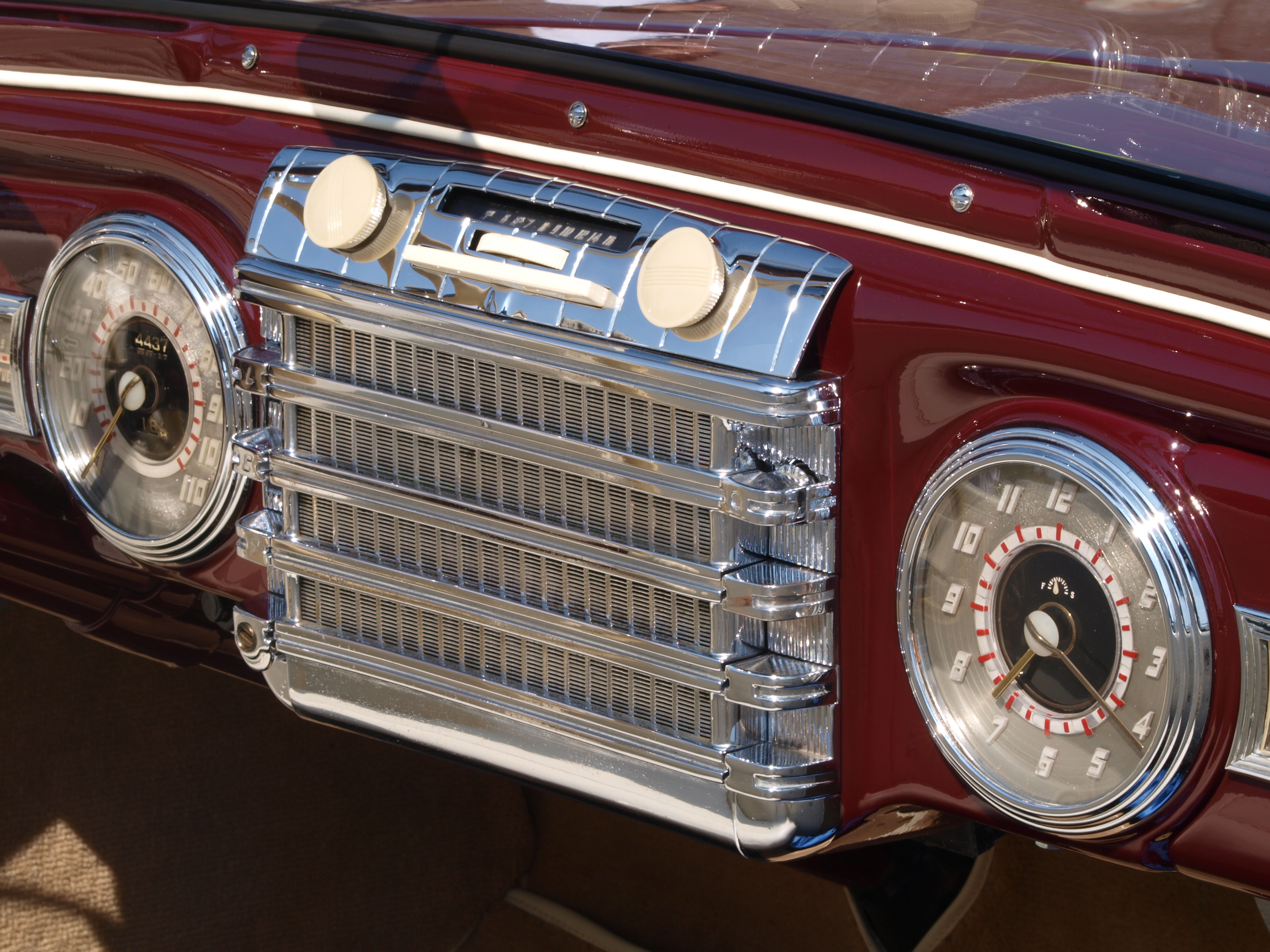
1942 Lincoln Continental Cabriolet radio

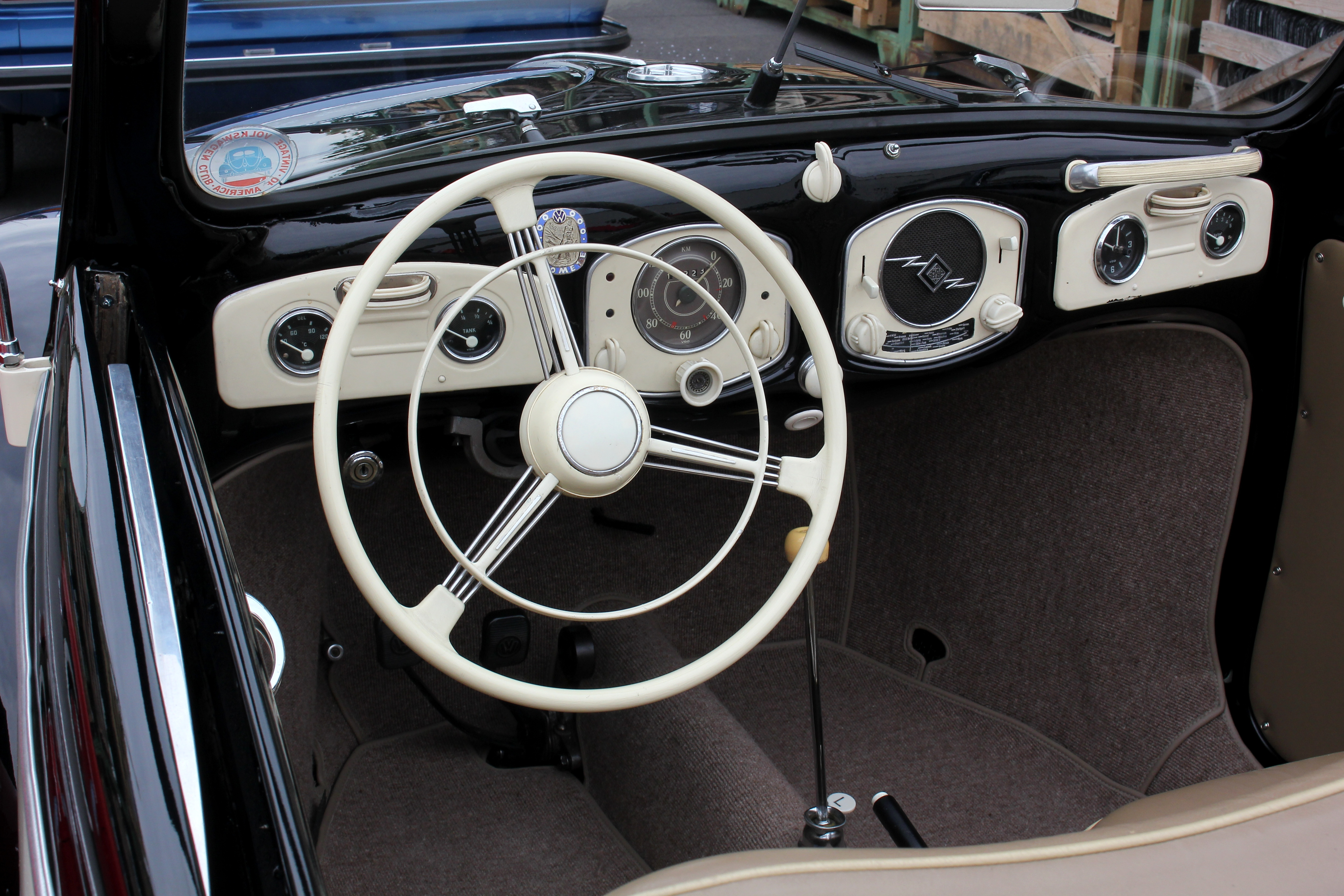
Dashboard of VW Hebmüller with Telefunken Radio (1949/50)

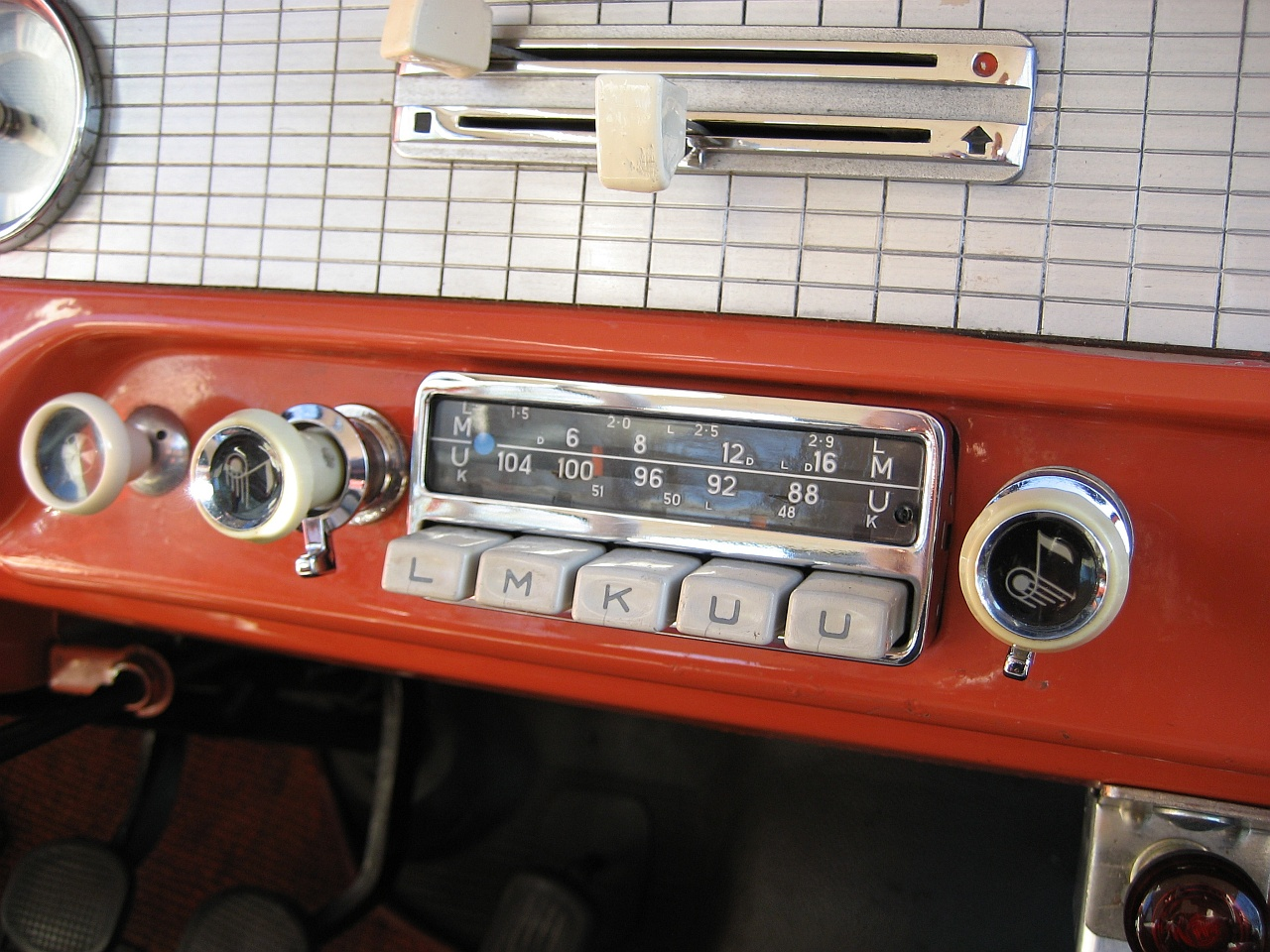
Blaupunkt Köln Radio – German 1958 Ford Taunus 17M P2 deLuxe

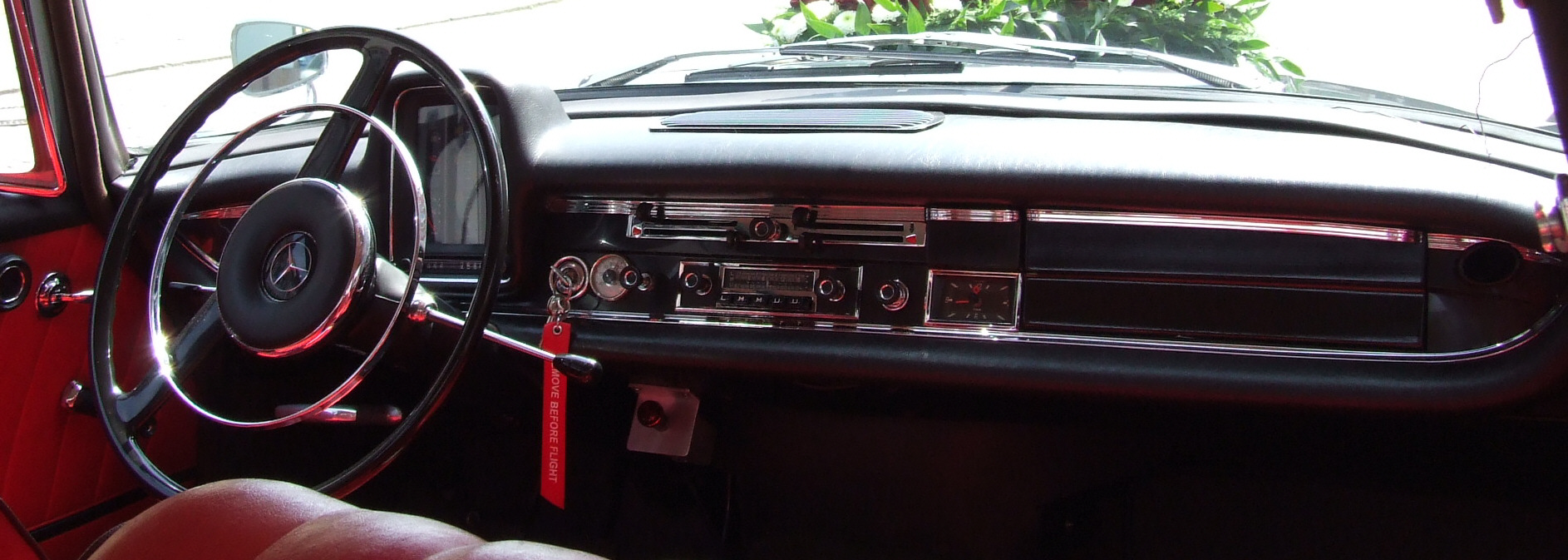
1964 Mercedes-Benz W110 190c dashboard with original FM Blaupunkt "Frankfurt" head unit.

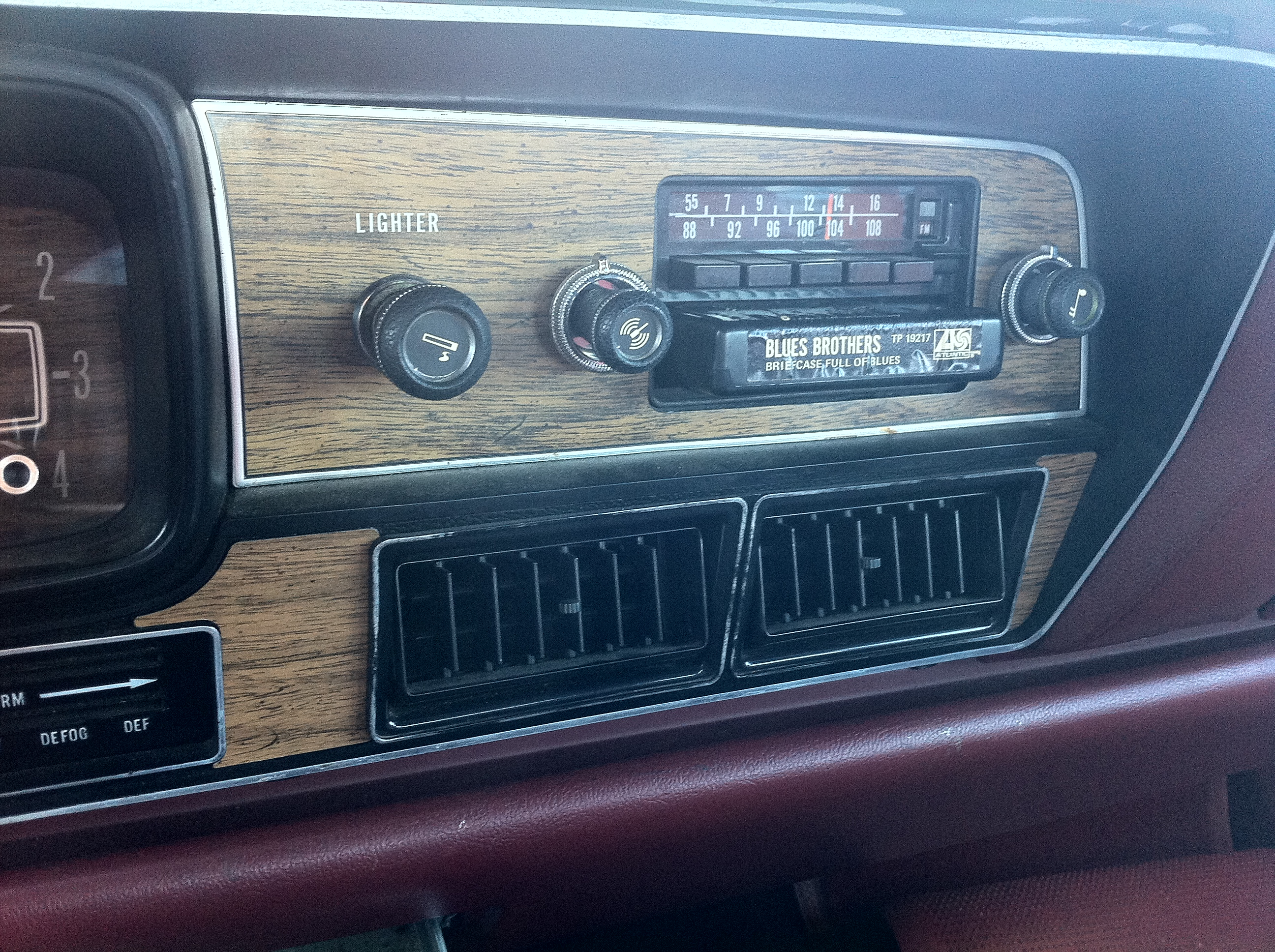
1978 AMC Matador sedan factory AM-FM-stereo-8-track unit with an album by The Blues Brothers

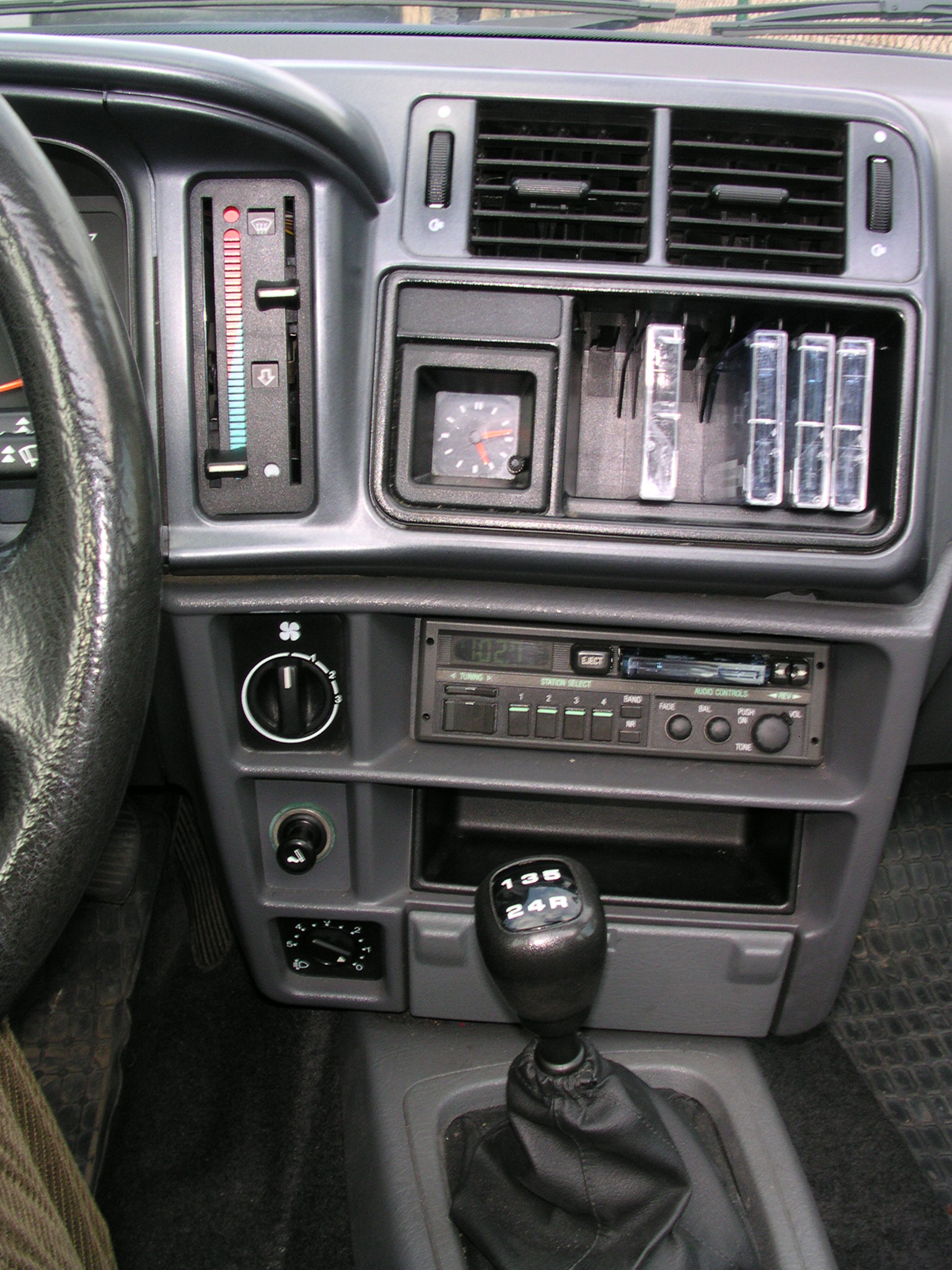
1990 Ford Sierra CLX Radio-Cassette head unit in a dashboard with cassette storage

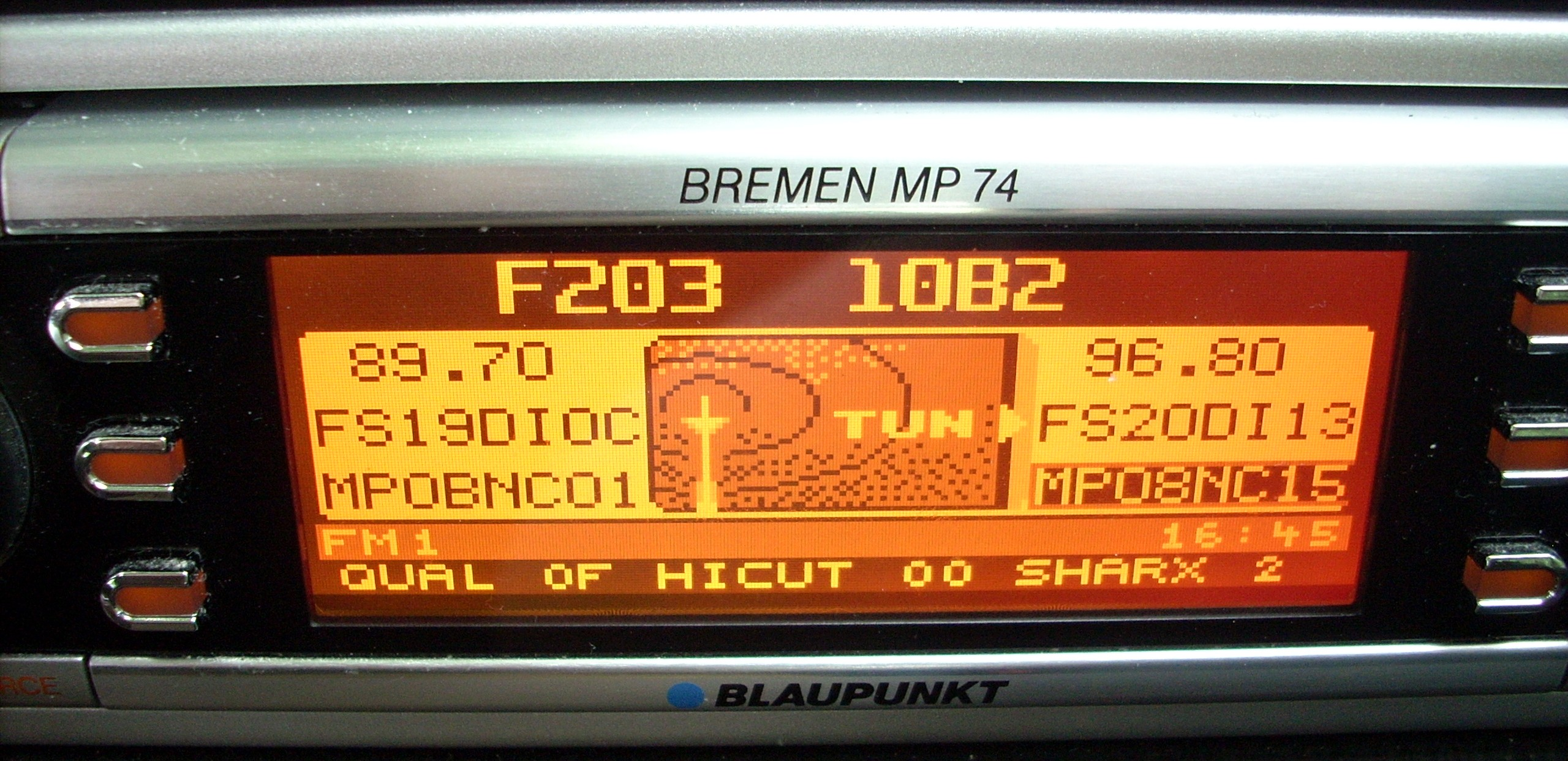
Early 00's Blaupunkt car radio (close look)

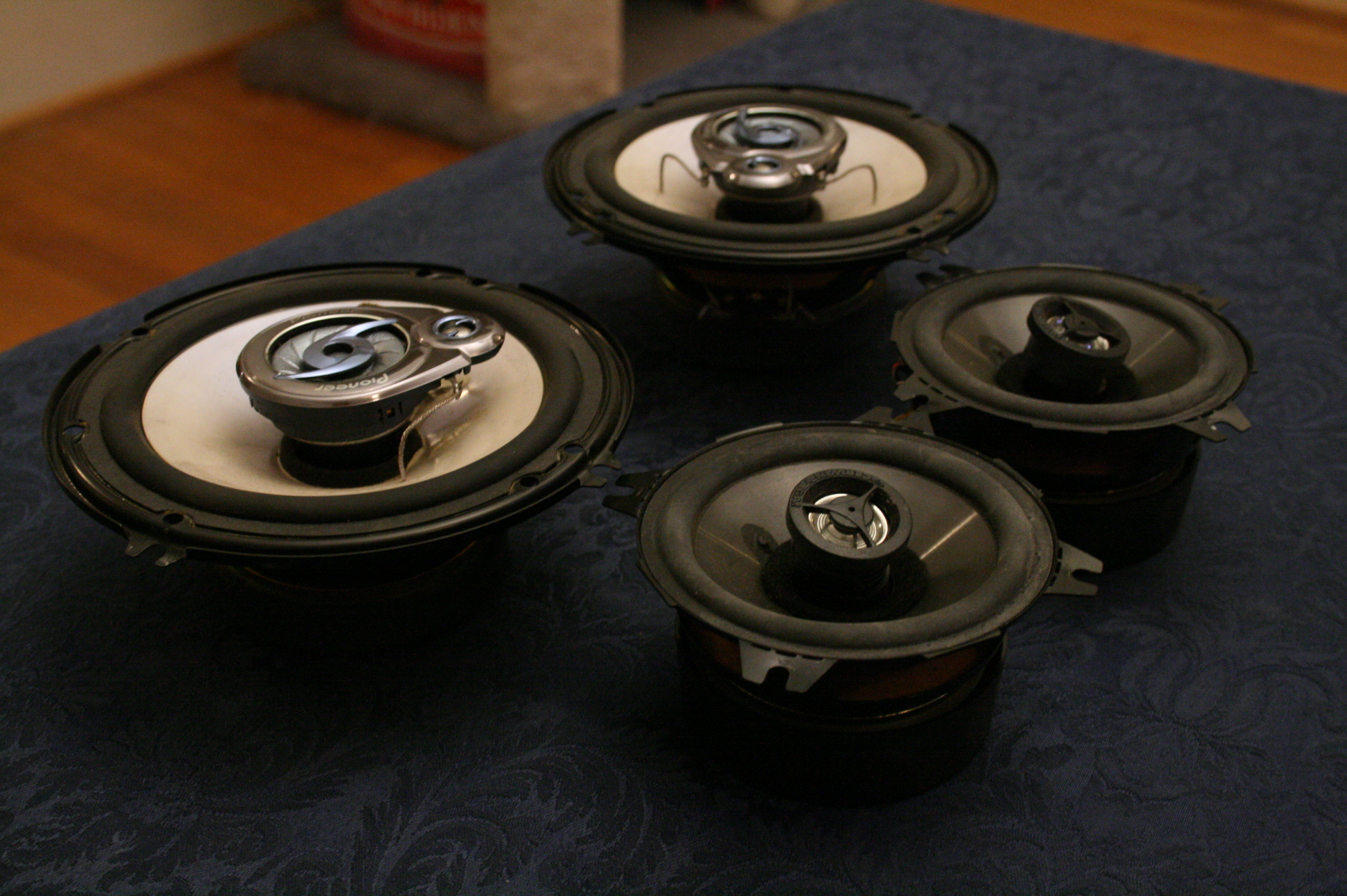
A set of speaker drivers removed from a passenger vehicle

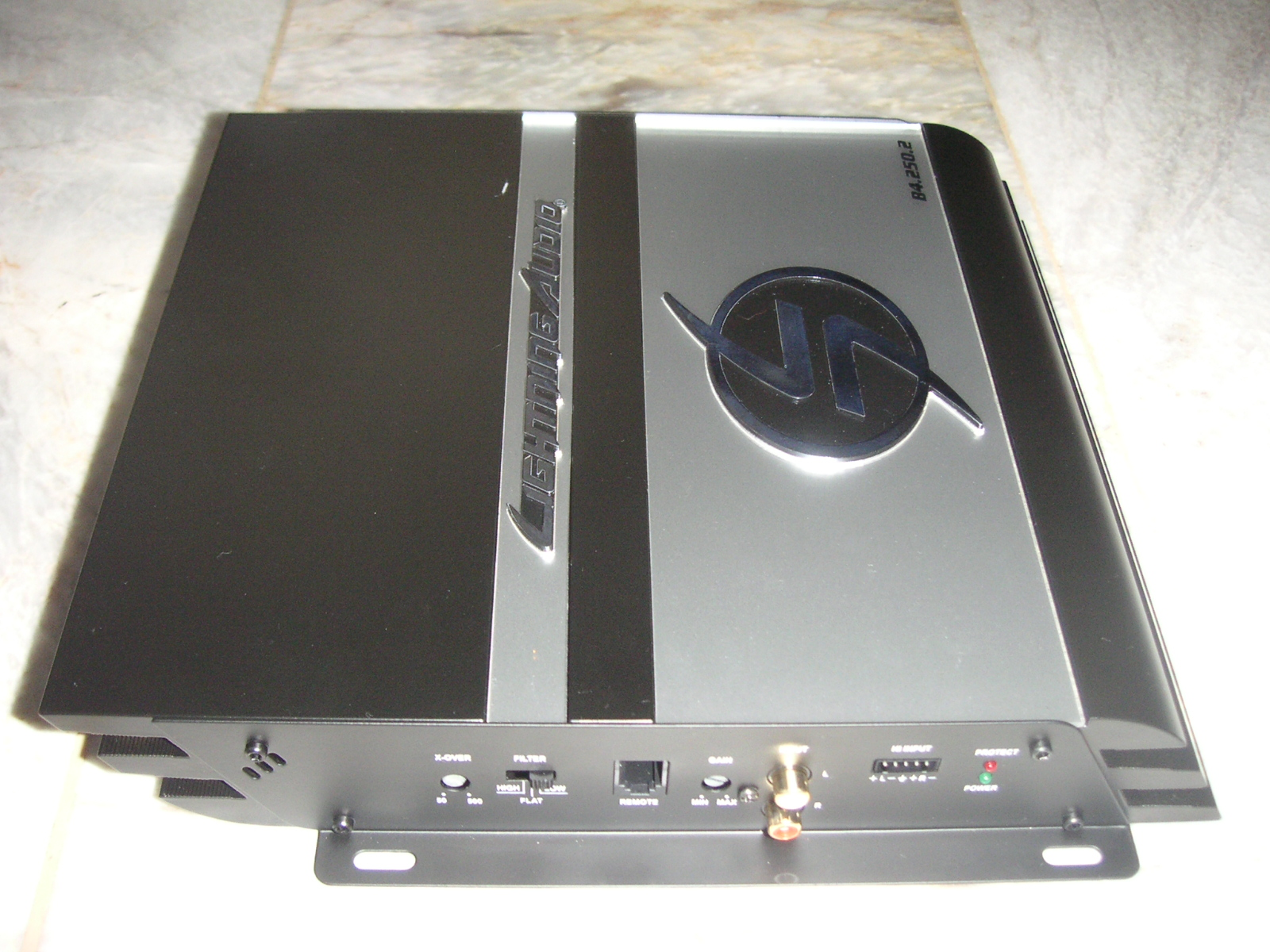
A car audio amplifier

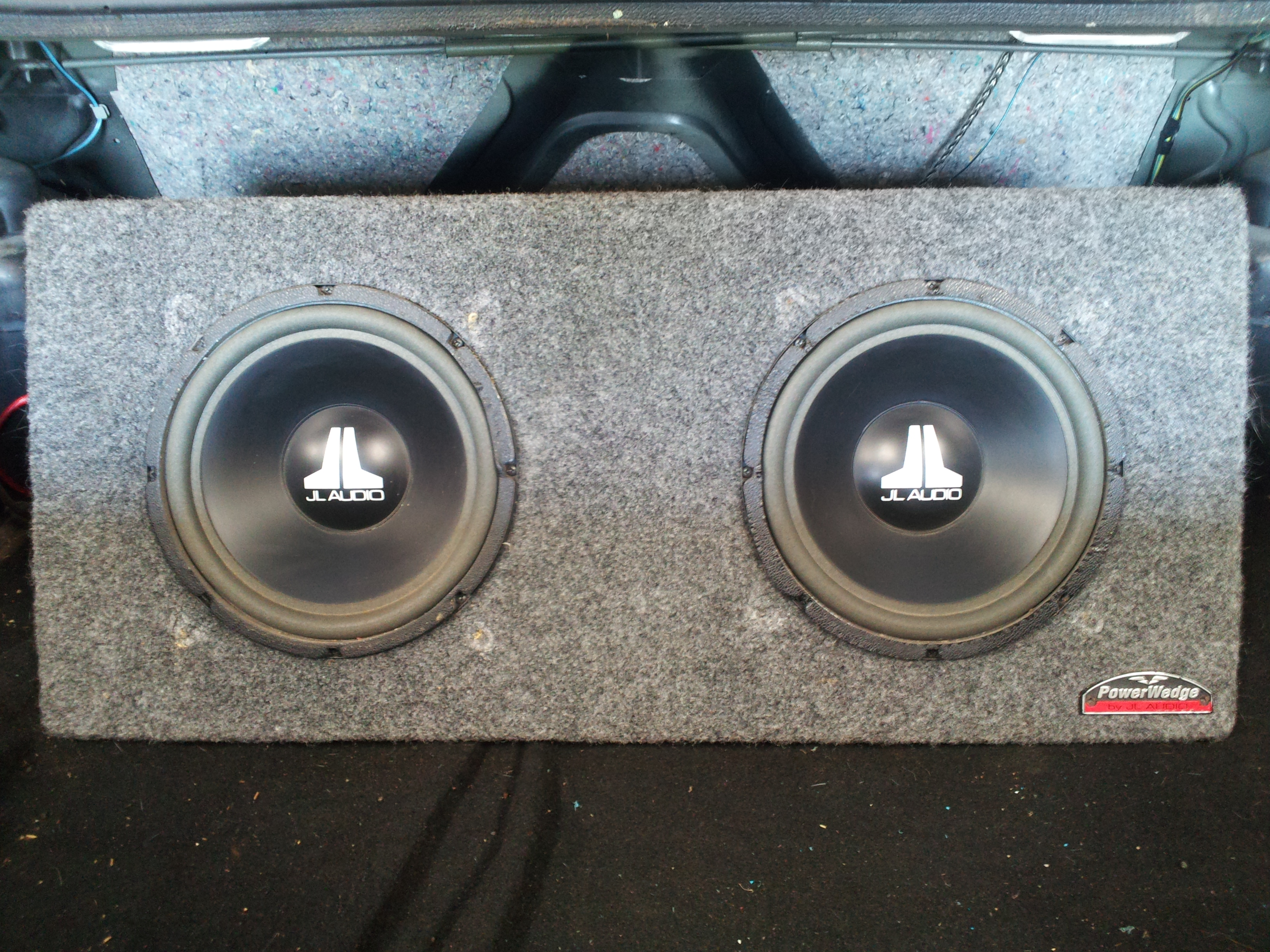
Two 10-inch (250 mm) subwoofers in the trunk of a car

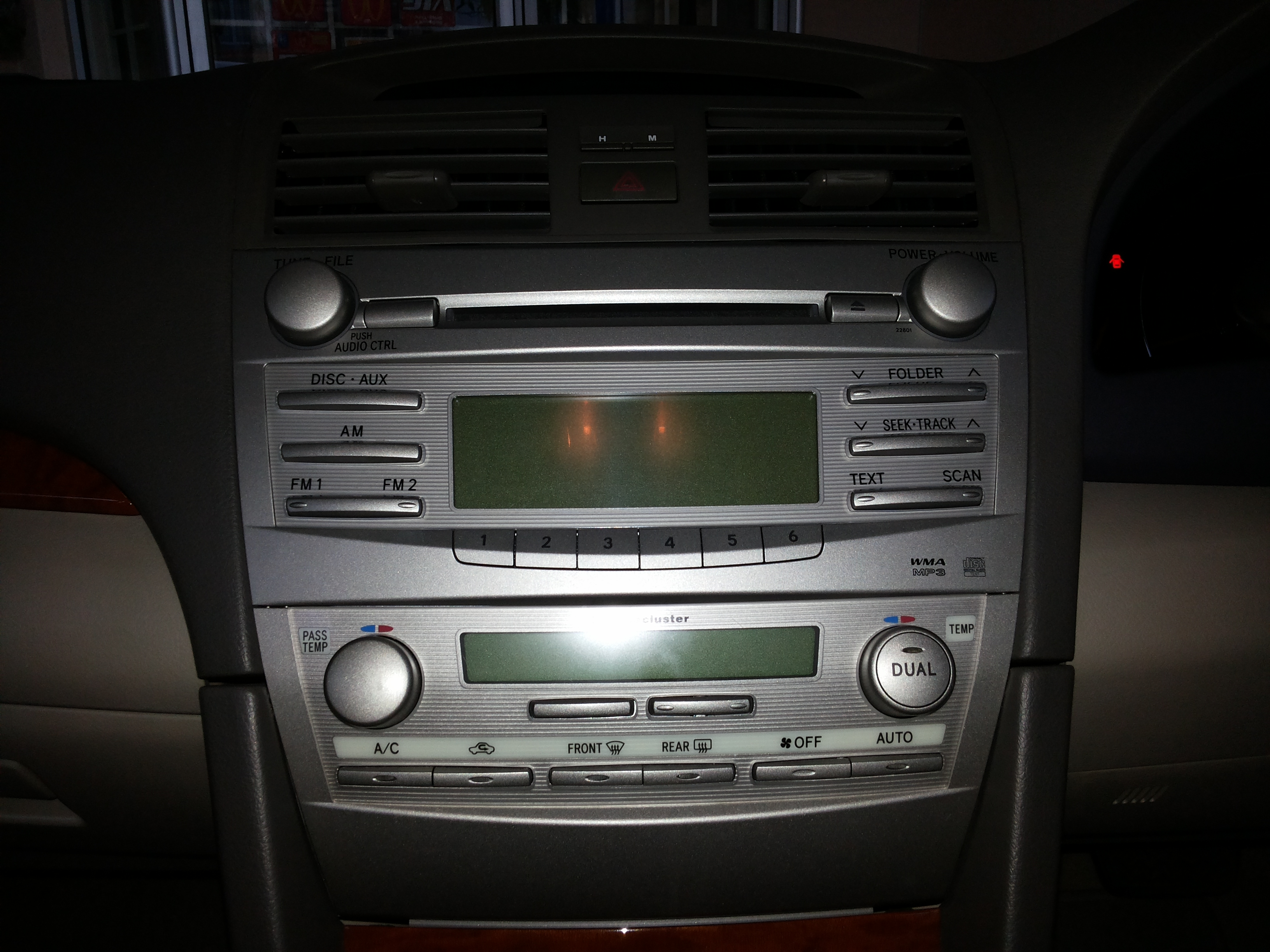
As technology keeps evolving, head units are now paired with the climate control system and other functions

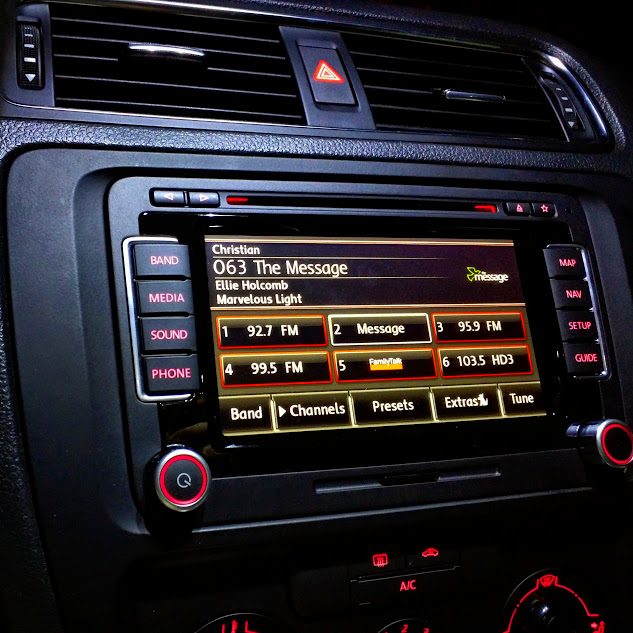
An example of the evolution: 2010's Volkswagen has a smart panel both with buttons and a touch screen to play music.

== See also ==
- Active sound design
- List of auto parts
- List of car audio manufacturers and brands
