= Noise Free America =

Non-profit opposed to noise pollution

Noise Free America is a national, non-profit organization aimed at reducing noise pollution in the community. The organization's main target is noise from boom cars (vehicles with loud sound systems), leaf blowers, motorcycles, and car alarms. Noise Free America has a 501(c)(3) non-profit status and has chapters in 27 states across the U.S. Its headquarters are located in Chapel Hill, North Carolina.

== Beginning ==
Noise Free America was founded in 2001 at UCLA. A group of student interns identified 44 sources of noise pollution around campus, including jackhammers, leaf blowers, edge trimmers, and power washing machines. The group found these noise polluters to be disruptive to the academic environment at the university.

== Features ==
Each month, Noise Free America issues a "Noisy Dozen" award to a major noise polluter. Past winners include the cities of Youngstown, Ohio; Stockton, California; and Sanger, Texas. The organization also gives a "Healthy Soundscape" award to cities that take steps to reduce noise. Past winners include West Chester, Pennsylvania.

Noise Free America also features an Ask an Expert section where people can ask technical questions about noise control. Noise control engineer Bob Andres is NFA's expert on noise pollution.

== Office of Noise Abatement and Control ==
In March 2009, Noise Free America released a 76-page document titled "The American Noise Pollution Epidemic: The Pressing Need for Reestablishing the Office of Noise Abatement and Control". The position paper lobbies for the reestablishment of ONAC, a sector of the Environmental Protection Agency dissolved by President Ronald Reagan in 1981.

== Federal legislative agenda ==
Noise Free America has called upon the federal government to declare noise a dangerous form of pollution, a serious threat to health and safety, and a public menace. To this end, Noise Free America recommends the following:

1. Establish a noise agency: The dormant Office of Noise Abatement and Control (ONAC) within the United States Environmental Protection Agency (EPA) should be revived with full funding.
2. Limitations on train horns: The Federal Railroad Administration (FRA) should reexamine its regulations regarding the length and duration of train horns at intersections that are equipped with bells, lights, and safety gates.
3. Limitations on back-up beepers: The Occupational Safety and Health Administration (OSHA) should reexamine its requirement for back-up beepers and trucks and vans. At the least, it should require back-up beepers of diminished volume.
4. Federal agencies study noise pollution: The President's Council on Environmental Quality, the United States Surgeon General, and the Centers for Disease Prevention and Control should study and publicize the health and safety hazards of noise pollution.
5. FTC warning labels: The Federal Trade Commission (FTC) should (a) require warning labels on products that are capable of causing hearing damage; (b) mandate a maximum decibel level for all electronically amplified products such as not to exceed "safe and reasonable" use; and (c) ban all toys whose noise levels pose a documented risk to the hearing of children.
6. Quieting jet aircraft: The Federal Aviation Administration (FAA) should set stricter noise thresholds for existing private and commercial internal combustion engine airplanes and mandate significantly quieter engines for future aircraft of this type.
7. Noise-silencing technologies: The FAA should give high priority to the goal of reducing by at least half the current "noise quotient" near existing airports within ten years using noise-sensitive routing protocols and noise cancellation and silencing technologies. Furthermore, substantial cash prizes should be awarded to designers and builders of prototypes of "the world's quietest airplanes" for selected categories of aircraft. The manufacturers of such aircraft should be granted significant tax benefits and other competitive advantages by Congress.
8. Limitations on "piped-in" music: The FAA shall set a maximum decibel limit for music "piped in" to airport terminals under its jurisdiction.
9. Limitations on car stereos: The National Highway Traffic Safety Administration should impose standards on allowable decibel levels for car stereos.
