= Active sound design =

Active sound design is an acoustic technology concept used in automotive vehicles to alter or enhance the sound inside and outside of the vehicle. Active sound design (ASD) often uses active noise control and acoustic enhancement techniques to achieve a synthesized vehicle sound.

The typical implementations of ASD vary, from amplifying or reducing an existing sound to creating an entirely new sound. Each vehicle manufacturer may use different software or hardware techniques in ASD, as there is no one unified model. ASD exists under multiple names, like Acura’s Active Sound Control, Kia’s Active Sound System, Volkswagen’s Soundaktor, and QNX’s Acoustic Management System.

The first instance of in-vehicle active noise canceling (ANC) was developed by Lotus and featured in the 1992 Nissan Bluebird. In 2009, Lotus partnered with Harman International for an improved ANC system that eliminated noise from the road, tires, and vehicle chassis. With recent demand for economical and cleaner combustion engine vehicles, engine systems have become more efficient but less audibly appealing to consumers. Electric and fuel cell vehicles operate with high-pitched tones, lacking the recognizable sound of a typical combustion engine. With ASD, both combustion and electric vehicle manufacturers aim to improve the reception of these vehicles by increasing the quality of interior and exterior vehicle sound.

== Components ==
Active noise cancelling (ANC) is a software process that uses existing in-vehicle infotainment hardware to eliminate undesirable noise within the interior of a vehicle. This elimination technique is known as harmonic order reduction, where unwanted audio signals are identified by sensors and filtered out of the overall interior vehicle sound. Manufacturers may use ANC within a vehicle to improve the effects of ASD.

Engine sound enhancement (ESE) is a technology that allows manufacturers to enhance engine sounds with synthetic noise composed from live engine data, including components such as engine revolutions per minute (RPM) and engine torque. This synthetically composed sound is relayed through interior or exterior vehicle speakers. In ASD, manufacturers may use ESE to enhance perceived engine power without the mechanical alterations that other techniques may require.

== Motivations for ASD ==
In the face of environmental restrictions and demand for fuel economy in the automotive industry, smaller engine subsystems have made interior vehicle noise less pleasant in combustion engine vehicles. Electric and hybrid vehicles lack a distinct engine sound altogether, instead featuring a quieter high frequency noise that causes annoyance for vehicle passengers and poses a threat to pedestrians who may not recognize an oncoming vehicle. These developments have sparked consumer demand for a more desirable interior sound, as well as a brand identity in both the interior and exterior of the vehicle that is recognizable and mitigates safety risks.

Traditional iterations of sound control in vehicles included tedious mechanical alterations such as balance shafts and sound-deadening material that increased manufacturing time and cost. With the renewal of sound design in the form of ASD, manufacturing costs and complications are reduced. Instead of integrating the technology into the engine structure, the sound can be fixed at a later stage of development and optimized to the vehicle.

== Variations ==
Active sound design (ASD) takes inputs from engine and vehicle speed, pedal input, exhaust noise, and vehicle vibrations to change the interior and exterior noise of the vehicle. These input variables are filtered to produce desired outputs. Variations of ASD select one or multiple of these variables to implement a new sound. These variations include:

- Passive sound generation : signals taken directly from the engine output and relayed in the interior of the vehicle.
- Passive and active sound generation: amplifying the exhaust input and creating a new output to enhance the vehicle's exterior noise.
- Active mounts : taking inputs from the exterior vehicle and feeding vibration outputs to the vehicle interior.
- Synthetic sound : generating a new sound through the interior stereo audio.

== Application and Theory ==
In a typical combustion engine, cylinders are responsible for burning gasoline and producing energy to power the vehicle. These cylinders fire periodically and can be reduced to a series of sinusoidal waves (by conventions of the Fourier transform). These sine waves are dictated by the rotations per minute (RPM) of the engine crankshaft and the firing order, or arrangement, of the cylinders. To enrich engine sound in the passenger cabin, the harmonic orders of engine sound missing from the interior sound can be amplified through Digital Signal Processing (DSP) techniques.

To capture the missing orders, the engine load condition is identified by acceleration sensors on the engine of older vehicles, or by way of the Controller Area Network bus (CAN-bus) in modern cars. Using dynamic band-pass filters (a device that relays specified frequencies), the missing orders are passed. To minimize artefacts (disruptive clicks) during the transfer, the signal is passed through cascading high- and low-pass filters. With an adaptation from the engine’s RPM signal (captured by an inductive voltage transformer), the orders are amplified through the vehicle firewall (body separating the engine from the interior) and interior sound system.

=== Subharmonics and Sound Signatures ===
In electric and fuel cell vehicles, virtual (synthetic) sounds are often used to accommodate for the absence of a combustion engine sound. To create the optimal sound design in an electric vehicle (EV), manufacturers must acknowledge the psychoacoustic theories behind a sound preference. In a study of diesel engine sound quality, experimental analysis compared a subjective rating of sound quality components with J.D. Power’s APEAL study.

Based on studies of user preference in vehicle interiors, manufacturers aim to reduce loudness increment and high-frequency sound for a more pleasant driving experience. In modern EVs, the stock vehicle noise is masked with an RPM-dependent low-pass-filtered sound. This low-pass-filtered sound is a lower-frequency synthetic sound that is based on the EV’s actual engine parameters, like speed and load.

Alt and Jochum’s simple-integer ratio technique of harmonic order is applied to this virtual noise. Subharmonics (lower-frequency copies) are then isolated from the original high-frequency components of the EV. In an evaluation of several generated sound stimuli, individuals subjectively identified that these subharmonics were preferable for the interior sound of an EV.

Combustion engine vehicles respond dynamically to different driving conditions. For manufacturers to synthesize a brand sound in an EV, they must consider a sound signature that encompasses a dynamic driving sound. A base sound signature is defined by a schematic of sub-signatures and micro-signatures that can be expanded to increase the dynamic quality of the sound. These sub-signatures can be assigned to parameters (load, speed) or maneuvers that relay particular sound samples. By synthesizing micro-signatures in EV drivetrains, the resulting sound is more vivid and emotional than the base frequencies of the EV.

== Challenges ==
=== Consumer Response ===
For the average consumer, the advent of ASD goes largely unnoticed. With recent BMW models, however, consumers feel cheated by the synthetic engine sound. Numerous instructional videos featured online give a step-by-step on disabling ASD within BMW’s vehicles, as well as articles that addressed the false-sounding synthetic noise.

=== Brand Identity for electric and fuel cell vehicles ===
Typical combustion engine vehicles provide sound feedback during operation that represents the brand identity of the car. Because of the nature of the single gear system and arrangement of power converters in electric and fuel cell vehicles, the frequency of sound changes minimally over a period of acceleration and is not well matched to the actual state of the vehicle speed and load. Additionally, the lack of engine noise leaves a spectral gap (empty space) between wind and road noise and amplifies individual vehicle components, reducing the sound quality inside the cabin.

To create a brand identity, manufacturers must choose between reproducing a typical combustion engine sound and creating an entirely new sound concept.

=== Reproduction of the combustion engine process ===
Current implementations of active sound design in combustion engine vehicles may not accurately reproduce the micro structure variations (variations between cylinder firings) of the combustion process. As the signal waves originate from multiple periodically firing cylinders, identifying and replicating the harmonic engine orders is an inefficient process. Additionally, this approach assumes uniformity in the combustion engine. The force provided from the cylinders is periodic and may vary from one cycle to another, making it impossible for the natural component of engine noise to be replicated.

== Example Applications ==
Several automotive companies implement their own branded versions of ASD technology.

- In vehicle models such as the BMW M5, an engine management system enhances the sounds provided by speed and engine power by filtering through the audio data it receives. Drivers can select a driving setting that will modify the interior acoustics as well as the actual performance of the vehicle.
- Similarly, the Kia Stinger features five drive modes (eco, comfort, smart, sport, and custom) that adjust the loudness and aggressiveness of the sound inside the vehicle cabin. Paired with a turbocharged engine, this vehicle is engineered to adapt to user preferences. The turbocharger increases efficiency and forces additional compressed air into the combustion engine, creating a consistent and clean sound output.
- Porsche’s ASD implementation combines a Helmholtz resonator and sound symposer to transport engine sounds directly into the vehicle cabin. The Helmholtz universal resonator restricts engine sound through an electronically controlled valve that oscillates with air, much like the sound that is emitted when one blows over the top of a bottle. The sound symposer consists of a line of plastic tubing with a membrane and flap valve that behave much like a human ear. When the Sport button is pressed, the resonator and sound symposer open fully to amplify the engine sound in the vehicle cabin.

== See also ==
- Active noise control
