= Soundaktor =

Automotive audio technology

Soundaktor is a vehicle audio system used to simulate engine noise in the cabin of some Volkswagen automobiles. It consists of a speaker mounted on the firewall between the engine and the cabin, which adds noise to the cabin in order to replicate the driving experience of older vehicles that had lower levels of sound insulation. This system was introduced in 2011 on VW's Golf/GTI, and has also been used on the Jetta/GLI, and Beetle Turbo. The same technology has also been used in other cars from Volkswagen Group, including the Audi S3 and Škoda Octavia vRS.

The sound generated by this device has been described as "a sort of buzzy, fizzy noise". It has been reported to play a digital recording of engine noise, but Volkswagen claims that these reports are false, and that it reproduces the actual engine noise of the car. Some diesel cars produced by the Volkswagen Group also have an "exhaust soundaktor". This system uses additional speakers in the exhaust system of the car to generate "a low-pitched, roaring sound" intended to make the car sound less like a diesel and more like a conventional gasoline engine.

Other vehicle manufacturers have also used artificial engine noise systems, implemented in other ways. Some models of the BMW M5 add noise to the car's audio system, for instance, and the 2015 Ford Mustang also added a system for sending the car's engine noise through its speakers. Multiple manufacturers have shaped the engine compartment or installed resonant pipes within it in order to direct greater amounts of actual engine noise to the cabin, a system also used by VW before switching to Soundaktor.

== See also ==
- Noise pollution
