= SmartDisk =

SmartDisk may refer to:

- SmartDisk (company), computer storage manufacturer
- NetVault: SmartDisk, a backup software product
- Verbatim SmartDisk, a computer data storage product
