= List of DVD manufacturers =

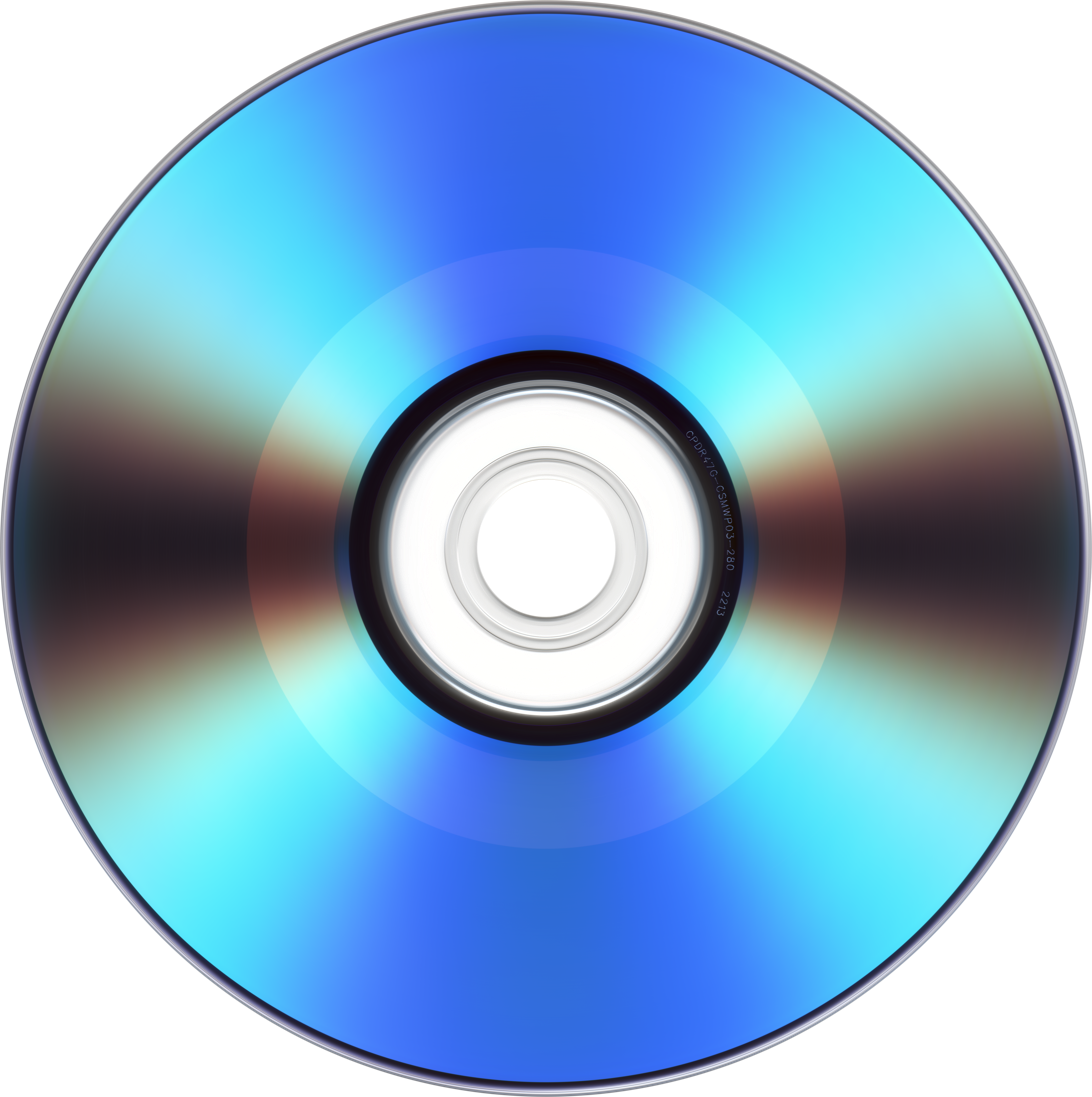

This aims to be a complete list of DVD manufacturers.

This list may not be complete or up to date. If you see a manufacturer that should be here but isn't (or one that shouldn't be here but is), please update the page accordingly. This list is only a list of brand names for DVDs and not an actual manufacturers list.

== A ==
- Aiwa
- Akai
- Alba
- Amazon
- Amstrad
- Apex Digital
- Apple
- Acme
- Acer
- Asus

== B ==
- Bang & Olufsen
- BenQ
- Bose
- Bush

== C ==
- CMC Magnetics
- Craig Electronics

== D ==
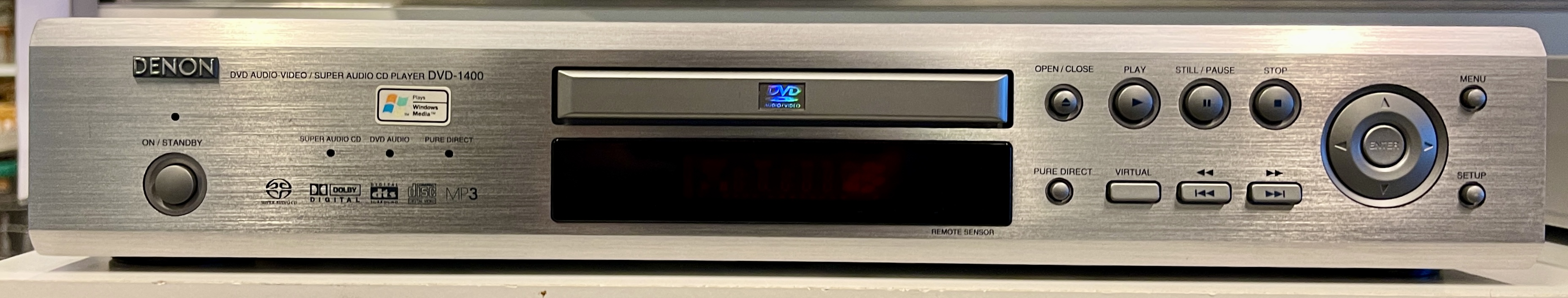
Denon DVD-1400

- Daewoo Electronics
- Denon
- Dell

== E ==
- Emerson

== F ==
- Facebook
- Funai
- Fukuda

== G ==
- GE
- Google
- Grundig

== H ==
- Harman/kardon
- Hitachi
- Hewlett-Packard

== I ==
- Imation

== J ==
- JVC

== L ==
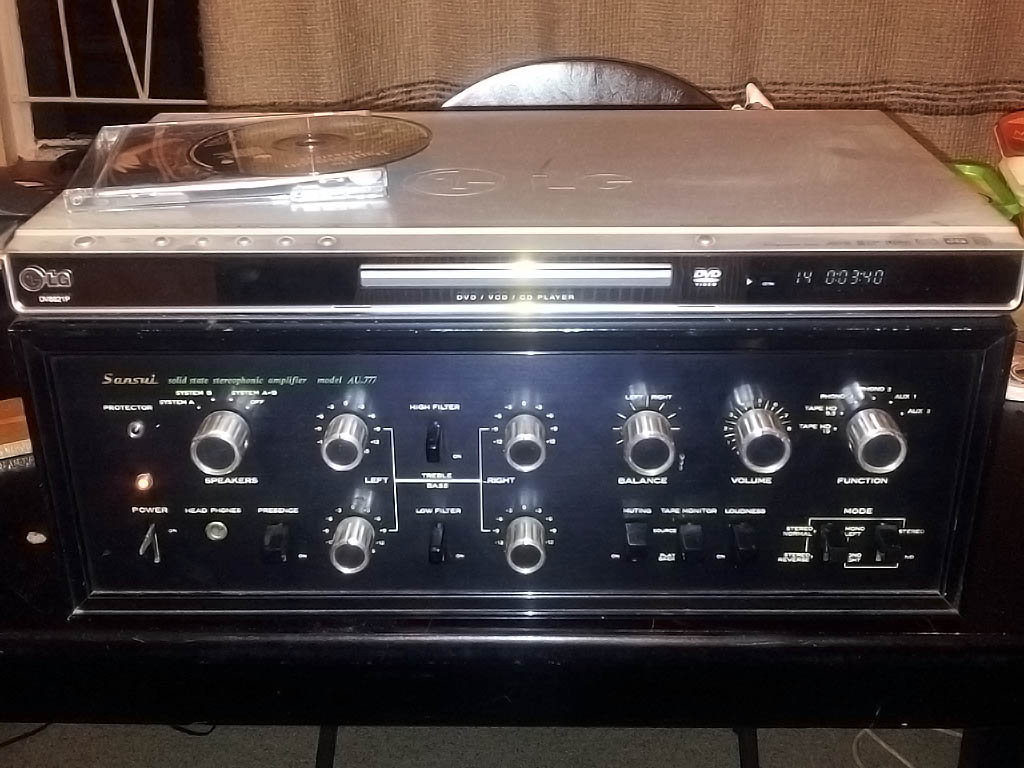
LG DVD/VCD Player on top of a Sansui AU-777

- Lenovo
- LG
- LiteOn
- Loewe

== M ==
- Magnavox
- Marantz
- Maxell
- Medion
- Memorex
- Microsoft Windows
- Mitsubishi Electric
- Moser Baer

== N ==
- NEC

== O ==
- Onn
- Oppo
- Orion Electric

== P ==
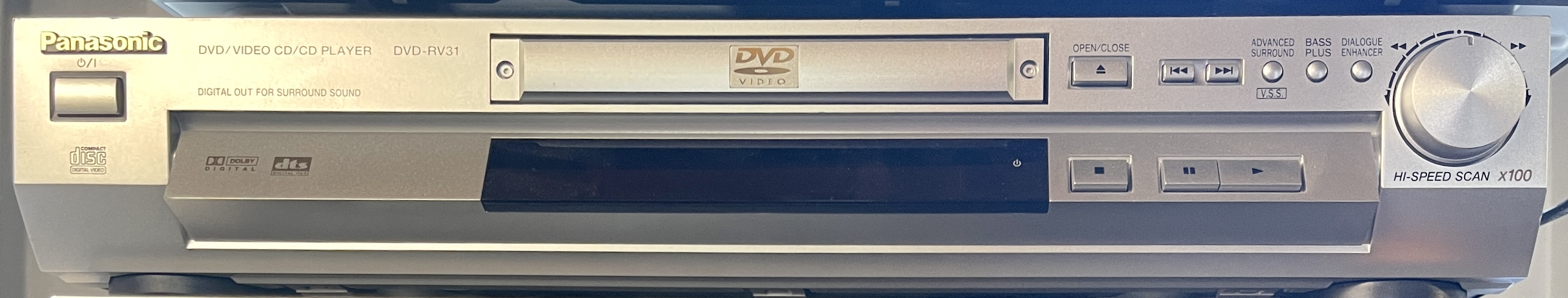
Panasonic DVD-RV31

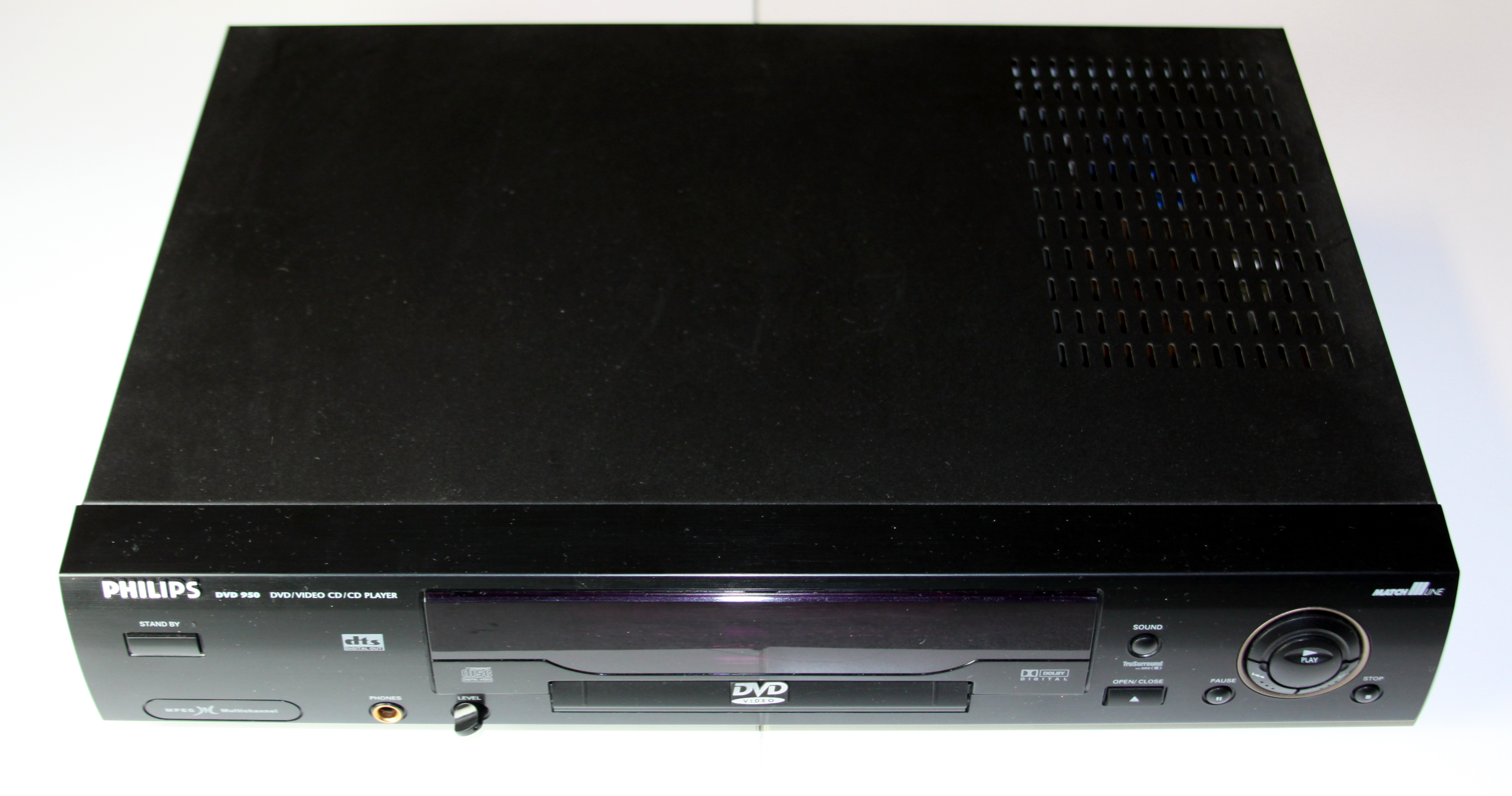
Philips DVD 950

- Panasonic
- Philips
- Pioneer
- ProScan

== R ==
- RCA
- Ritek
- Ricoh

== S ==
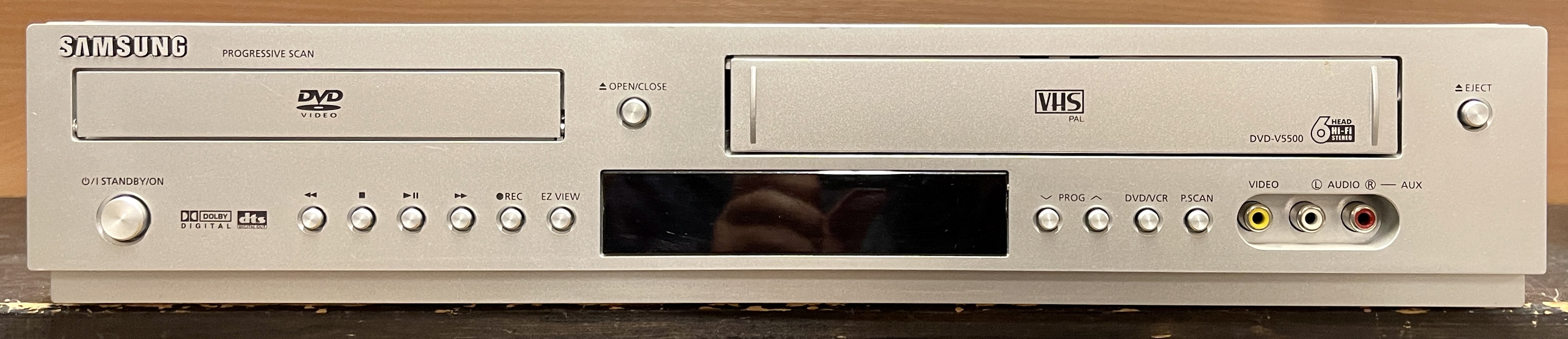
Samsung DVD-V5500 with VCR

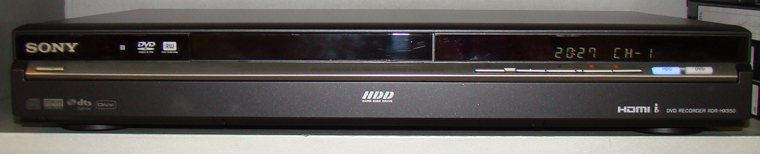
Sony Professional DVD-HDD-Recorder

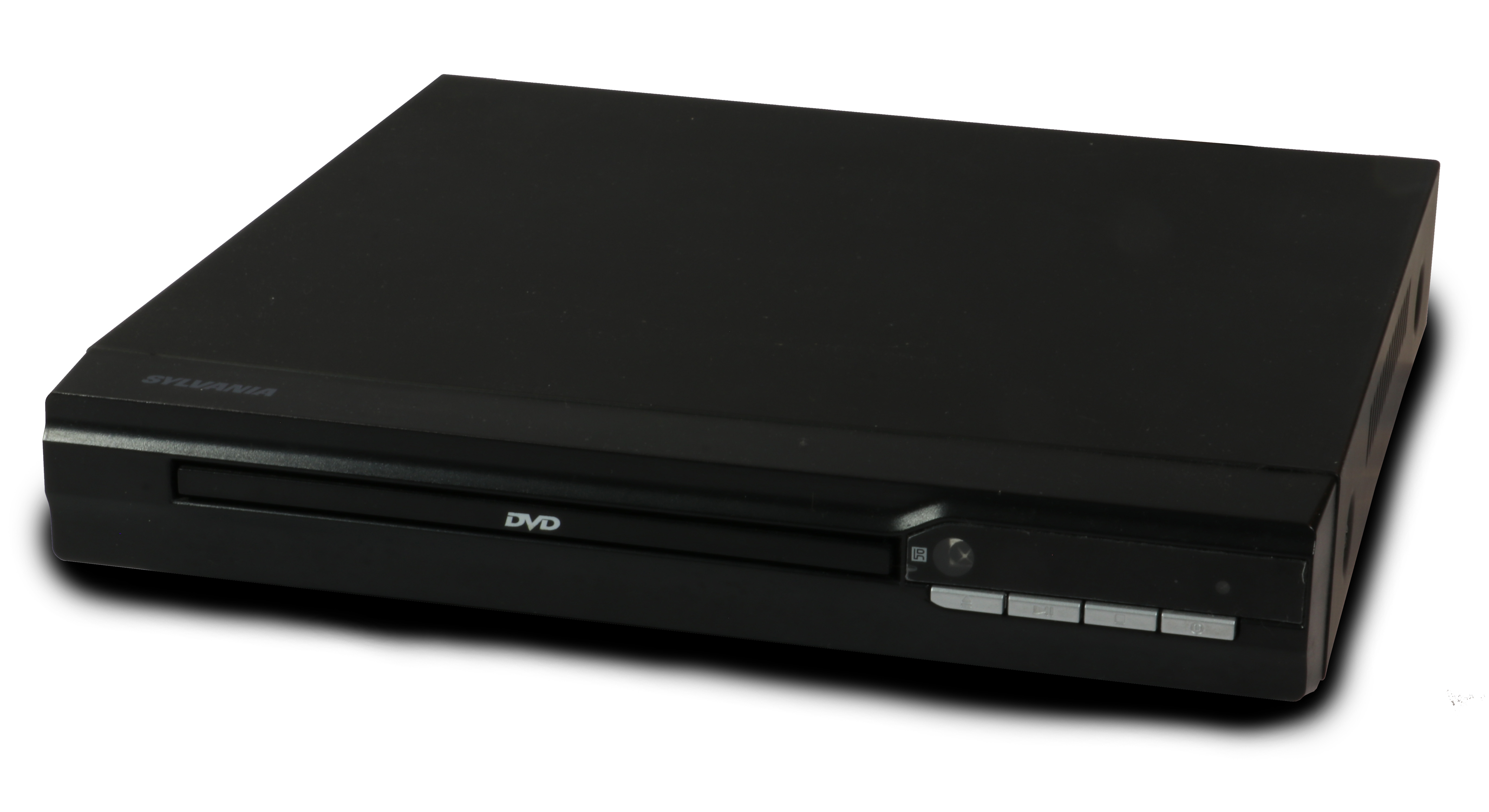
Sylvania SDVD1650 DVD Player

- Samsung
- Sanyo
- Sharp
- Sony
- Sylvania
- Symphonic
- SM Pictures

== T ==
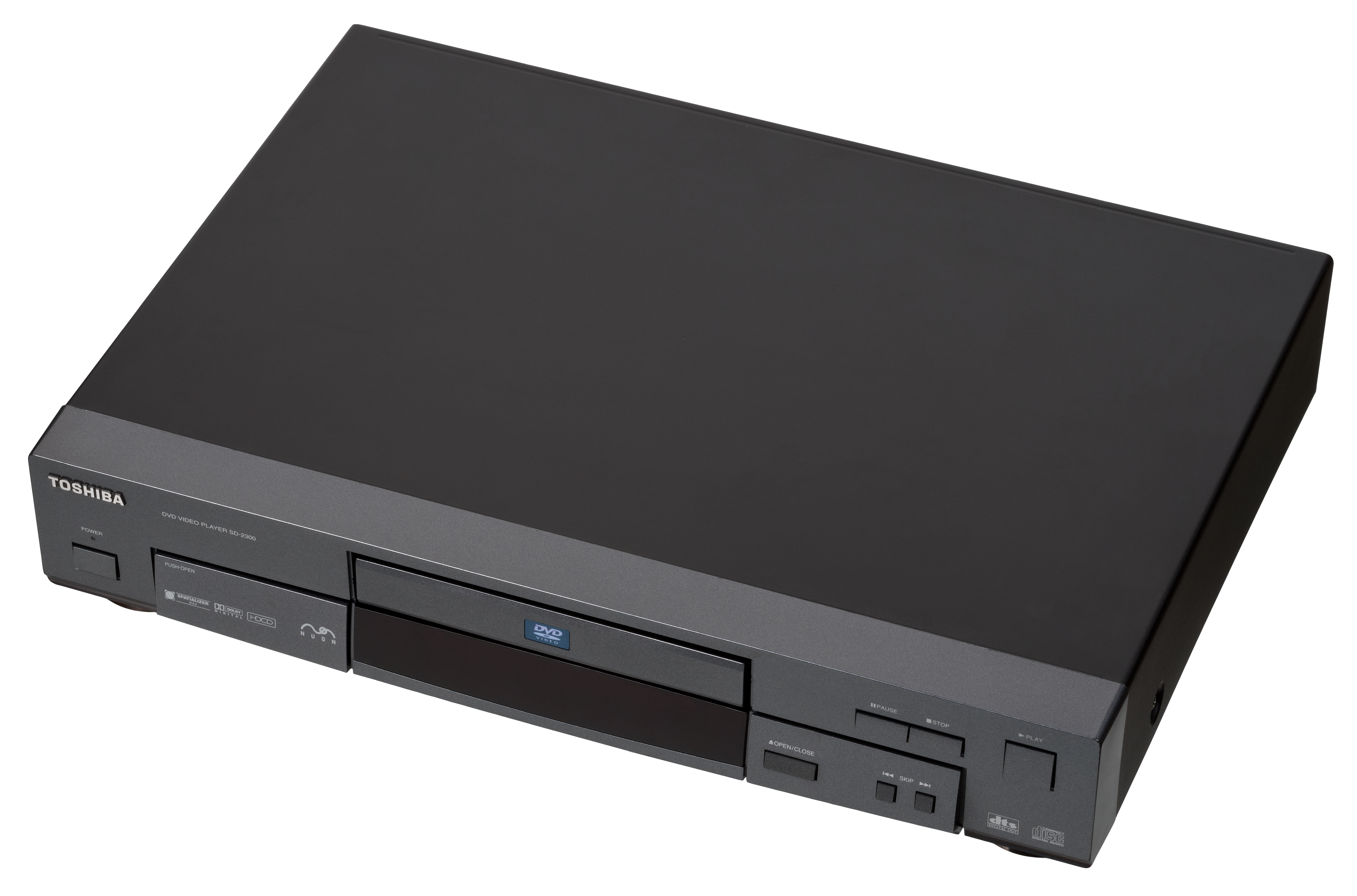
A Nuon DVD player manufactured by Toshiba

- Teac
- Technics
- Technika
- Thomson
- Toshiba

== U ==
- Ultradisc

== V ==
- Verbatim Corporation

== Y ==
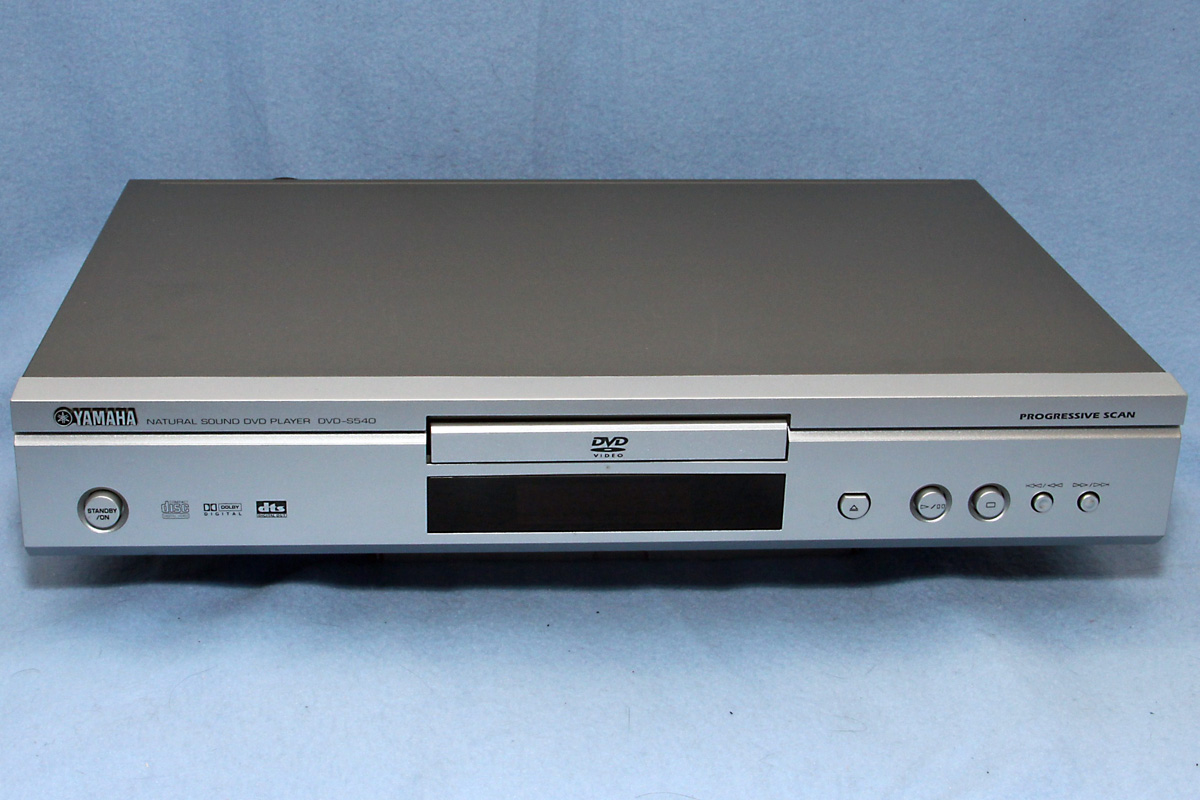
Yamaha DVD Player S540

- Yamaha

== Z ==
- Zenith

== See also ==
- DVD
