= START Lab =

START Lab Inc. (株式会社スタート ・ ラボ; Sony Taiyo Yuden Advanced Recording Technology Laboratory) is a joint venture of Sony Corporation and Taiyo Yuden Co., Ltd. The headquarters are in Chiyoda, Tokyo.

START Lab, founded in June 1989, was active in the optical media business. Initially intended to produce small-scale runs of CDs for business customers on the basis of newly developed CD-R technology, it pioneered the sale of CD-R media to consumers. The current president is Masanori Kimizuka. 50.1% of START Lab is owned by Sony, 49.9% is owned by Taiyo Yuden.

START Lab ceased operations in March 2016 after parent company Taiyo Yuden ended production of storage media.

Well-known product lines included the That's consumer media, the That's CD-R/DVD-R for master product line, and the CD/DVD error checkers (ES-50, ES-70, ES-1000 rebranded Almedio model).
