= Freecom =

Freecom Technologies GmbH
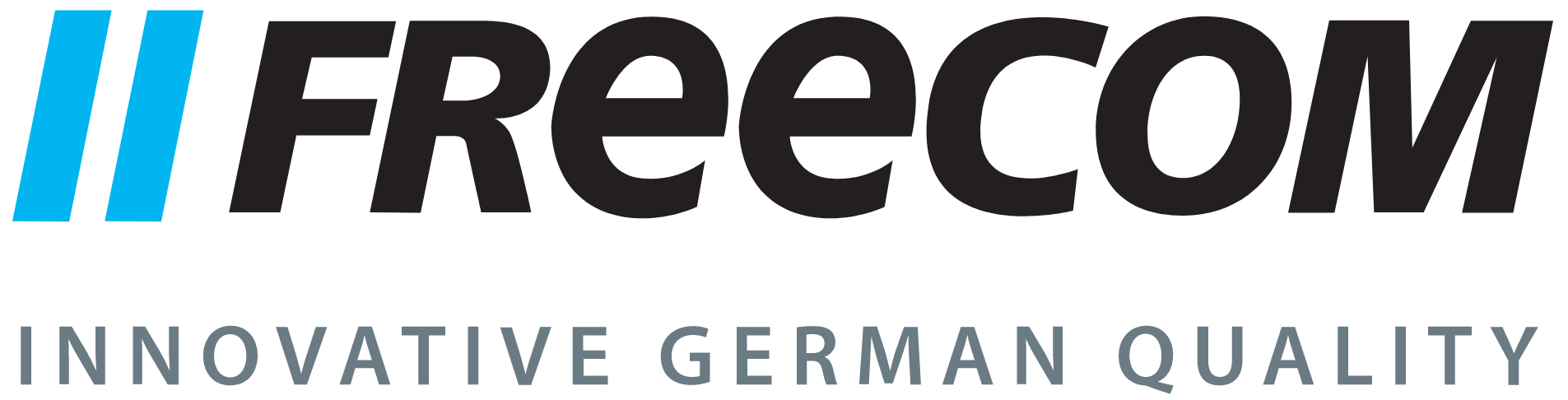

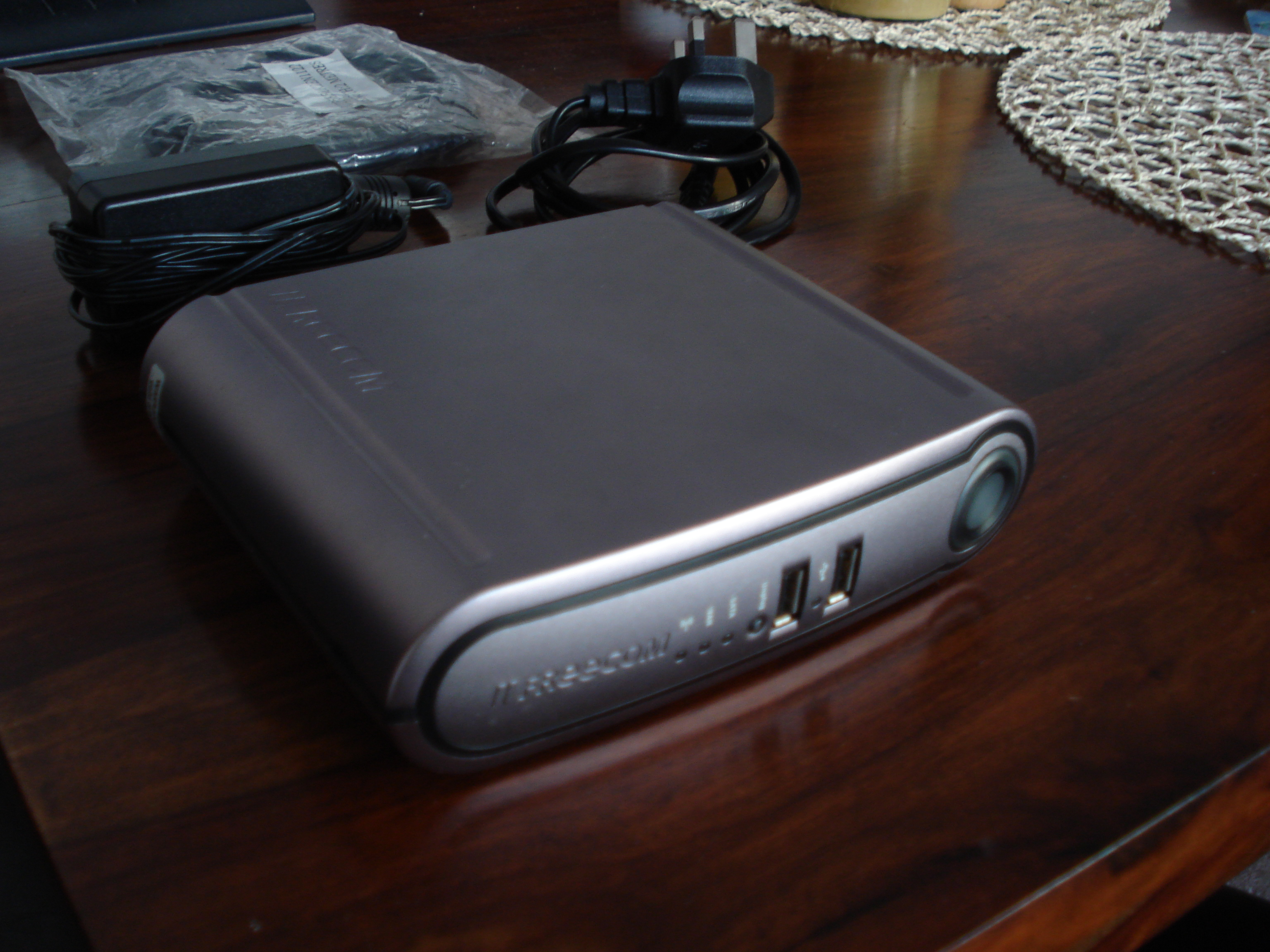
- Freecom FSG-3
- Company type: Private
- Industry: Electronics
- Founded: 1989; 37 years ago
- Founder: Dick Hoogerdijk; Axel Lucassen
- Headquarters: Berlin, Germany
- Area served: Worldwide
- Products: Computer hardware
- Owner: Verbatim (100%)
- Parent: Verbatim
- Website: www.freecom.de

Freecom Technologies GmbH is a German manufacturer of computer peripherals. Its products include USB hard disks (where the actual hard drive is manufactured by Samsung and others), USB flash drives, USB DVB-T television receivers and a data recovery service. The original President and CEO was Dick C. Hoogerdijk and Managing Director is Axel Lucassen. It is the first company to release an external hard drive to USB 3.02 standards.

The company was founded in 1989 and sold to Verbatim in 2009.

In 2009 the company announced one of the first commercially available USB 3.0 external hard drives.
