= Taiyo Yuden =

Japanese electronics and former optical disc manufacturer

Taiyo Yuden Co., Ltd.
- Native name: 太陽誘電株式会社
- Company type: Public (K.K)
- Traded as: TYO: 6976; Nikkei 225 Component
- Industry: Electronics
- Founded: Tokyo, Japan (March 23, 1950; 76 years ago)
- Founder: Hikohachi Sato
- Headquarters: 2-7-19, Kyobashi, Chuo-ku, Tokyo 104-0031, Japan
- Key people: Shoichi Tosaka, (CEO and President)
- Products: Ceramic capacitors; Inductors; Circuit modules (for power supply, high frequency products); Recordable optical media; Ceramic capacitors, ceramic chip antennas, SAW filters, baluns; Multilayer piezoelectric speakers; Varistors; NTC thermistors; Noise suppression components
- Revenue: ▲$ 2.112 billion USD (FY 2016) (¥ 230.72 billion JPY) (FY 2016)
- Net income: ▲$ 102.48 million USD (FY 2016) (¥ 11.2 billion JPY) (FY 2016)
- Number of employees: 18,753 (consolidated); 2,586 (non-consolidated) (as of March 31, 2017)
- Subsidiaries: That's Fukushima Co., Ltd.; START Lab Inc.; others
- Website: Official website

Taiyo Yuden Co., Ltd. (太陽誘電株式会社, Taiyō Yūden Kabushiki-gaisha; translated as Sun Dielectric Co., Ltd.) is a Japanese materials and electronics company, headquartered in Kyobashi, Tokyo, that helped pioneer recordable CD technology (CD-R) along with Sony and Philips in 1988. Founded in 1950, Taiyo Yuden currently operates factories in Japan, Singapore, Korea, China, the Philippines, Taiwan, and Malaysia.

It was well known for its recordable optical media, which were regarded by many to be the very best in the industry. In June 2015, Taiyo Yuden announced its intention to discontinue its recording media business by December of that year, citing market shrinkage, changing market conditions, difficulty while improving earnings and a hike in the cost of raw materials.

The company employs almost twenty thousand people worldwide and reports annual sales of more than $2 billion. The current CEO and President is Shoichi Tosaka. The company is a constituent of the Nikkei 225 stock market index.

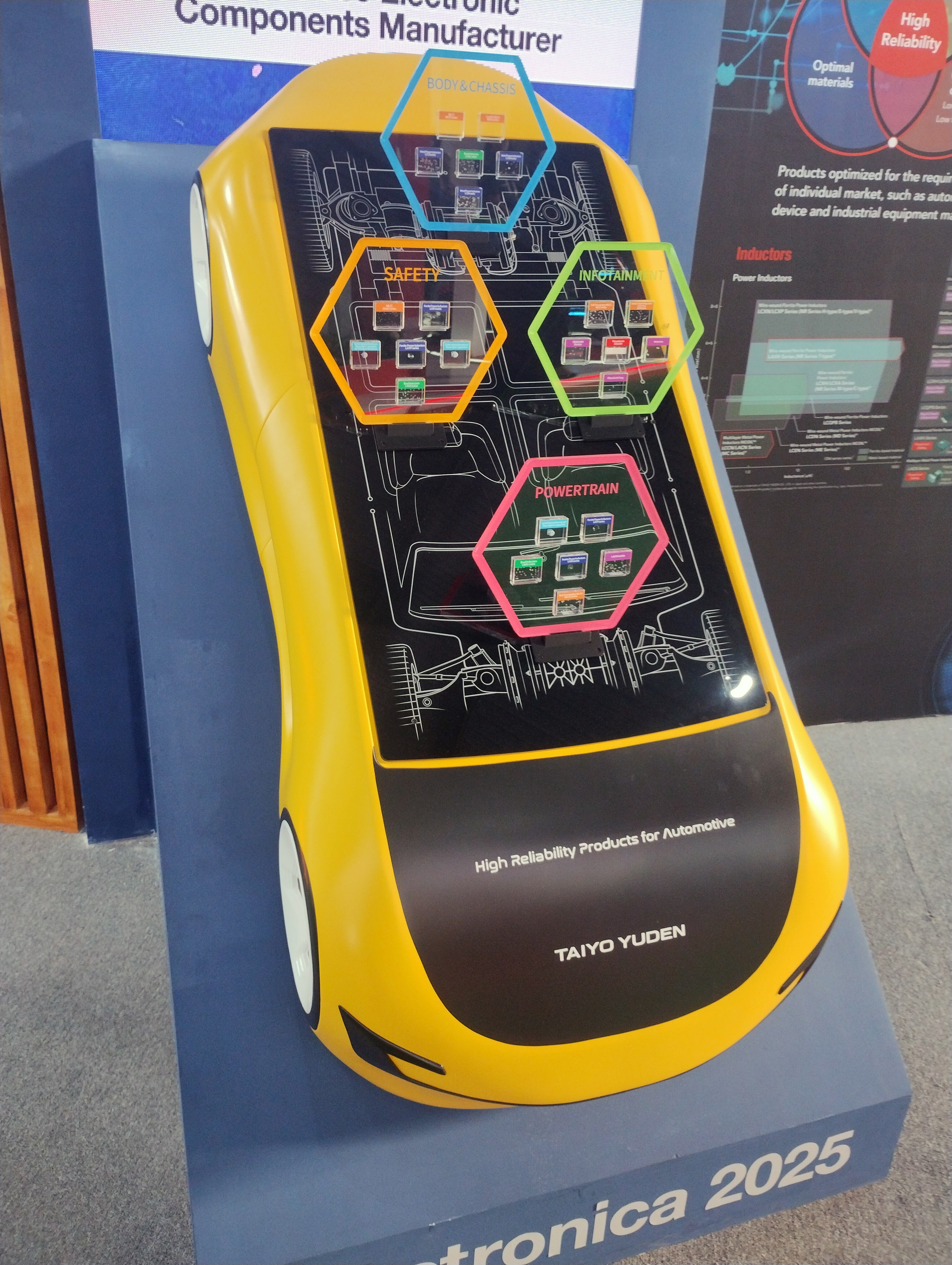
Taiyo Yuden at Electronica 2025, BIEC

== History ==
Taiyo Yuden was established by Hikohachi Sato on March 23, 1950, in Suginami, Tokyo.

In January 1973, Taiyo Yuden was listed in the First Section of the Tokyo Stock Exchange.

The world's first axial leaded ceramic capacitor is developed by company in July 1976.

"That's"-branded Audio tape, known as Triad in North America, was introduced to the market in 1982.

Since 1985, Taiyo Yuden has annually published Needs & Seeds (Taiyo Yuden Technical Report, ISSN 0911-5439).

In October 1988, the world's first CD-R was made by Taiyo Yuden and presented to the public under the brand name That's CD-R. However development had already begun as early as in summer 1985. The underlying organic cyanine dye technology was developed by a team of Taiyo Yuden engineers, Takashi Ishiguro and Emiko Hamada.

In 1987, START Lab Inc. was founded as a joint venture between Sony Corporation and Taiyo Yuden Co., Ltd. for the CD-R recording media business in Japan.

Taiyo Yuden introduced That's Double Density CD-R with 1.3 GB storage space in 2000.

In April 2003, an anechoic chamber test facility was established.

Effective March 1, 2006, the power supply factory in Mexico (formerly Taiyo Yuden de Mexico, originally Zentec Inc) was sold to Tamura Corporation.

The acquisition of Shoei Electronics Co., Ltd., formerly a subsidiary of Shoei Co., Ltd., took place March 1, 2007.

In October 2008, JVC and Taiyo Yuden established a new joint venture called Victor Advanced Media. In February of the same year the world's first recordable Blu-ray Disc using an organic dye recording layer is launched.

On June 11, 2015, Taiyo Yuden announced that it will withdraw from the recording media business, including CDs, DVDs, BDs, at the end of 2015. The same day, START Lab Inc. announced that it will discontinue selling optical discs at the end of February 2016.

== Products ==
- Bluetooth modules
- Capacitors
- CCFL Inverters
- Ferrite Beads
- High Frequency Multilayer Chip Antenna
- High Frequency Multilayer Chip Filter
- Inductors (multilayer, wire-wound chip, axial/radial leaded)
- Power Supplies (now redirected to Tamura Corp.)
- Recording media (made by That's Fukushima for START Lab)
- Resistors
- Simulation Tools
- Piezoelectric speakers

=== Recording media ===

Taiyo Yuden-branded products were not common outside Japan (where Taiyo Yuden media had a market share of about 60%), but unbranded CDs and DVDs were available from some online retailers. Rebranded Taiyo Yuden media could be found under Fujifilm, Fusion, Maxell, Miflop, Panasonic, Plextor, Sony, TDK, and Verbatim Corporation brands. In Japan, Korea and Greece, Taiyo Yuden distributed its own brand, "That's".

Taiyo Yuden positioned its blank media as a premium product which offered reliability, compatibility and peace of mind; the "Made in Japan" branding for That's media was chosen to symbolise quality differences in a graphic way, as consumers struggled to understand the difference in technology.

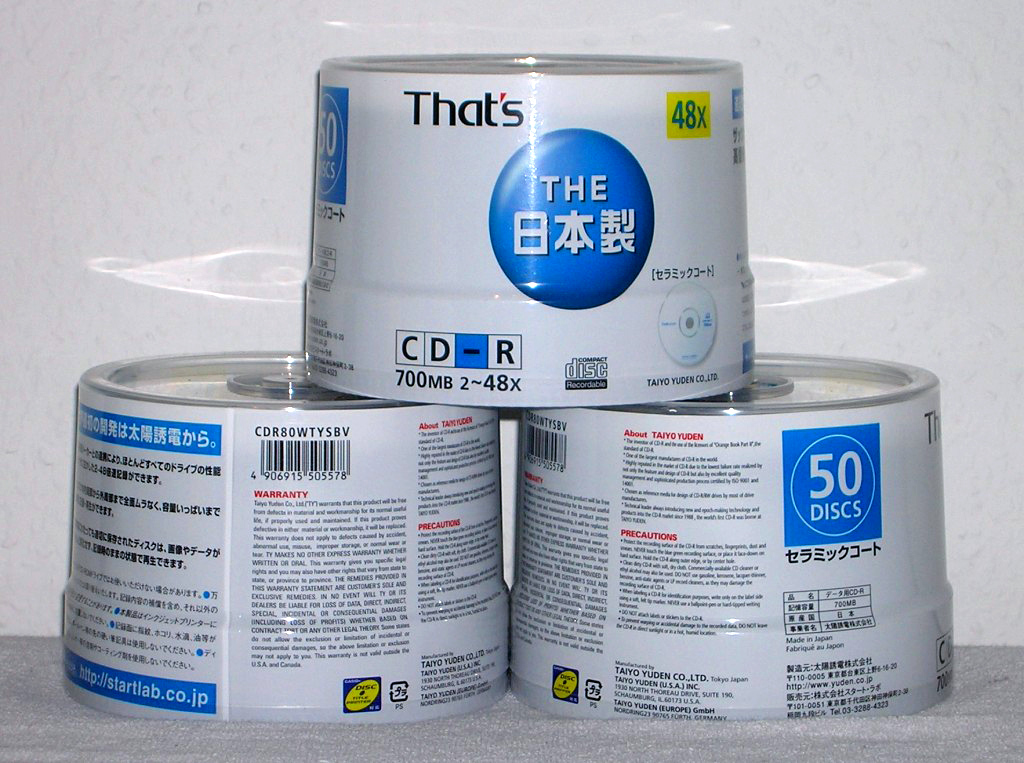
Spindles of That's brand blank CDs made by Taiyo Yuden

In October 2008, Taiyo Yuden partnered with JVC to form JVC Advanced Media as a marketing plan to distribute Taiyo Yuden media globally under the JVC brand name.

Taiyo Yuden has also developed the Autostrategy technology, a learning mode for DVD burners, for Plextor.

In mid-2015, Taiyo Yuden announced its plans to withdraw from the optical media business (including CD-R, DVD-R and BD-R) by December of that year. Taiyo Yuden sold its disc manufacturing patents and equipment to CMC Magnetics, and today the media is manufactured by CMC under the CMC Pro brand.

==== DVD media codes ====
DVD media manufactured by Taiyo Yuden have the following media codes:

media code	hub stamper code
TAIYOYUDEN: 2× DVD-R	GBxxxxxx
TYG01: 4× DVD-R	GDxxxxxx
TYG02: 8× DVD-R	GGxxxxxx
TYG03: 16× DVD-R	GHxxxxxx
TYG11: 8× DVD-R DL	BGxxxxxx
YUDEN000 T01: 4× DVD+R	TCxxxxxx or TSxxxxxx
YUDEN000 T02: 8× DVD+R	TGxxxxxx
YUDEN000 T03: 16× DVD+R	THxxxxxx

== Companies ==
The following companies belong to the Taiyo Yuden group:

=== Japan ===
- Fukushima Taiyo Yuden Co., Ltd. at Yanagawa Industrial Estate, Date City, Fukushima Prefecture (formerly That's Fukushima Co., Ltd.), production of metal power inductors (MCOIL™), formerly also production of blank CD, DVD and BD media
- Kankyo Assist Co., Ltd., polycarbonate recycling and environmental services
- S.E.T. Co., Ltd.
- START Lab Inc. (49.9% joint venture with Sony Corporation), distribution of That's brand optical media
- Sun Vertex Co., Ltd., personnel and staffing services
- Taiyo Yuden Chemical Technology Co., Ltd., surface treatment of electronic components, production and sales of printing masks and packaging-related tools
- Taiyo Yuden Techno Solutions Co., Ltd., EMS (printed circuit board and module assembly)
- Wakayama Taiyo Yuden Co., Ltd., production of metal power inductors (MCOIL™), wire-wound chip inductors, multilayer chip inductors for high frequency and ferrite chip beads

=== China (Mainland) ===
- Dongguan Taiyo Yuden Co., Ltd.
- Taiyo Yuden (Guangdong) Co., Ltd.
- Taiyo Yuden (Shanghai) Trading Co., Ltd.
- Taiyo Yuden (Tianjin) Electronics Co., Ltd., part of Korea Tong Yang Yujun Co., Ltd.

=== Europe ===
- Taiyo Yuden Europe GmbH

=== Hong Kong ===
- Hong Kong Taiyo Yuden Co., Ltd.

=== Korea ===
- Korea Taiyo Yuden Co., Ltd., production of circuitry products (inverters for LCD panels, battery protection modules for mobile devices, high-density surface mount boards)
- Korea Tong Yang Yujun Co., Ltd., production of conventional capacitors and inductors
- Korea Kyong Nam Taiyo Yuden Co., Ltd., production of multilayer capacitors

=== Malaysia ===
- Taiyo Yuden (Malaysia) SDN. BHD.
- Taiyo Yuden (Sarawak) Sdn. Bhd.

=== Philippines ===
- Taiyo Yuden (Philippines) Inc.

Established in 1988 and located at the Mactan Export Zone 1 (MEZ1) industrial hub at Lapu-Lapu City, Cebu. Primarily pioneered the assembly and mass production of inductors for various electronic companies worldwide.

- Taiyo Yuden Co., Ltd. Manila Representative Office

=== Singapore ===
- Taiyo Yuden (Singapore) Pte Ltd

=== Taiwan ===
- Taiwan Taiyo Yuden Co., Ltd.

=== Thailand ===
- TAIYO YUDEN TRADING (THAILAND) Co., Ltd

=== U.S.A. ===
- Taiyo Yuden (U.S.A.) Inc.
