= Cassette adapter =

Adapter to allow playback of external sources through a tape player

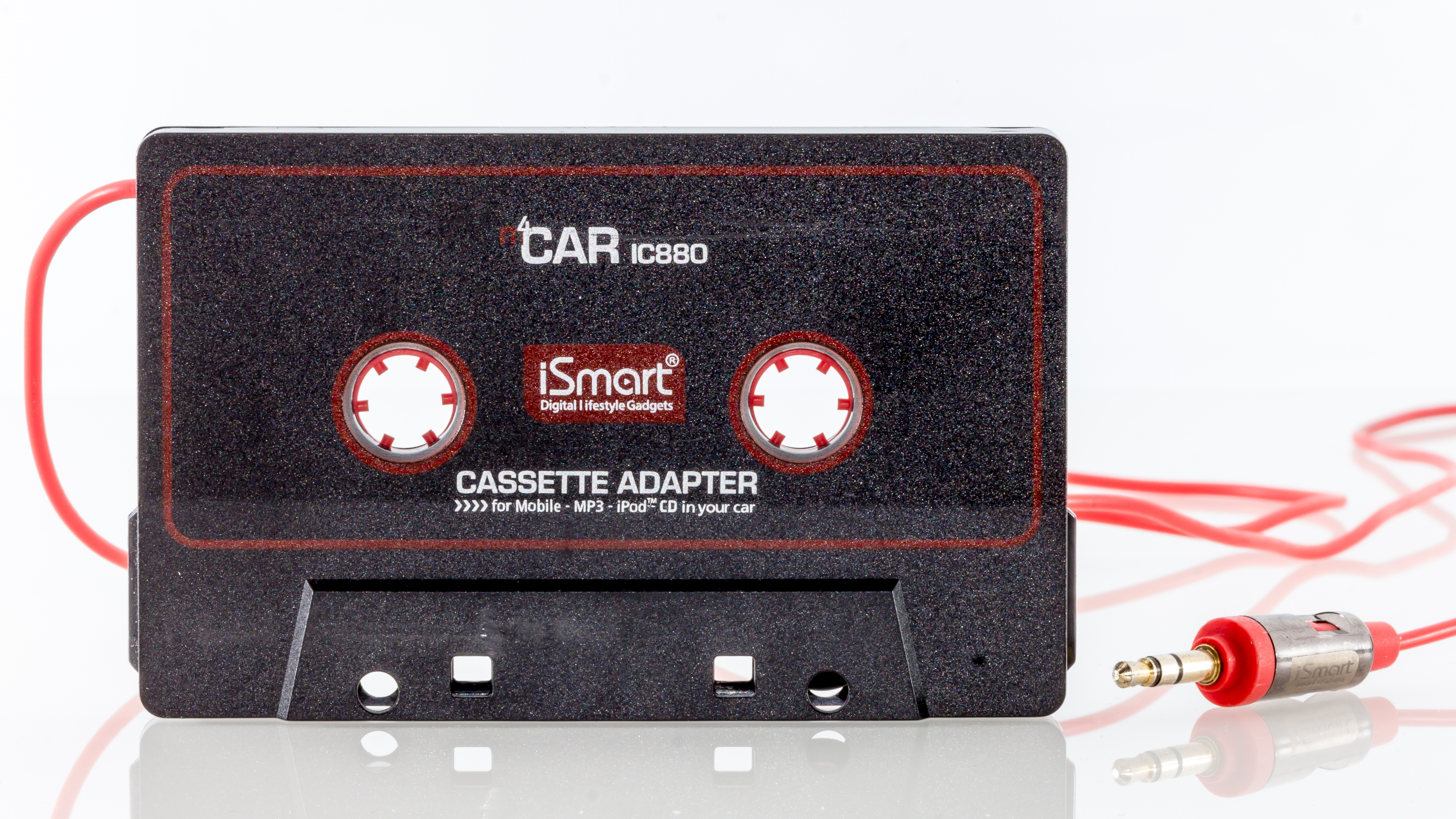
A typical cassette adapter: it is housed in a standard audio cassette shell, has reels for simulating movement, and has a cable with a 3.5 mm minijack phone connector to connect to the audio source and at the other end to the magnetic tape head inside the enclosure.

A cassette adapter, also called a car connecting pack, is a device that allows audio output from a different source to be played through sound systems with a cassette deck. It is primarily used for outputting audio from mobile phones, portable media players or portable CD players to car stereos with a cassette deck but without auxiliary (aux) ports built into their sound systems.

The cassette adapter is a "dummy" tapeless Compact Cassette. Instead of having magnetic tape, the adapter uses (typically) a writing tape head similar to the reading tape head on a cassette deck. The adapter's head connects to an audio source terminal using a stereo minijack connector cord, and the incoming electrical signal is converted into a magnetic signal to allow it to be read by the deck's head as if it were a normal cassette tape. One-way gears within the cassette simulate tape movement from reel to reel, to ensure that the deck does not auto-reverse.

== Creation ==
The invention of the adapter is credited to American engineer Larry Schotz, who filed a patent in 1986 which was granted on March 29, 1988. It was originally designed to connect portable CD players (like the Discman) to car stereos that only had cassette players. Since then many manufacturers have made and sold cassette adapters, including Sony, Panasonic, Maxell and Belkin. The adapters have also been marketed as a "CD/MD/MP3 cassette adapter" referring to the audio sources it can pick up for use on a cassette deck.

A newer type of cassette adapter uses Bluetooth wireless technology in place of a wired "aux" connector to connect to an audio source. These units have a built-in audio Bluetooth receiver module, powered by a small battery inside the shell and a power supply for charging. The first cassette adapter with Bluetooth was introduced in 2014 by ION Audio. Another type of cassette adapter introduced is a fully functioning MP3 player inside a cassette tape shell, which can be used as a stand-alone MP3 player with headphones or inserted as a cassette into the cassette player.

== Mechanism ==
A cassette adapter is shaped like a regular "Compact Cassette" audio cassette tape. However, instead of having reels of magnetic tape inside, it has a transmitting head where the tape is normally read by the reading head. This transmitting head is connected to the input cord, which connects the head to the audio source, typically using a 3.5 mm "aux" phone connector or using wireless Bluetooth.

Advanced cassette players monitor tape movement to detect when the tape ends, which is done using a rolling wheel that rides against the tape. Because of this, a cassette adapter must also include a mechanism that simulates tape movement. To simulate tape movement, a system of gears or a drive belt connects the tape player's drive motor (via the take-up spindle) to a wheel inside the adapter. This wheel rides against the detection wheel to simulate tape movement. Because the wheel never stops spinning, the deck never senses an end-of-tape and never tries to reverse the tape. Some adapters contain a one way locking mechanism, to stop the detection wheel if the tape is played in the wrong direction (and thus reading the wrong side of the head). The stopped wheel then would cause the cassette player to either stop the tape, or reverse the direction if the player supports it.

== Applications ==
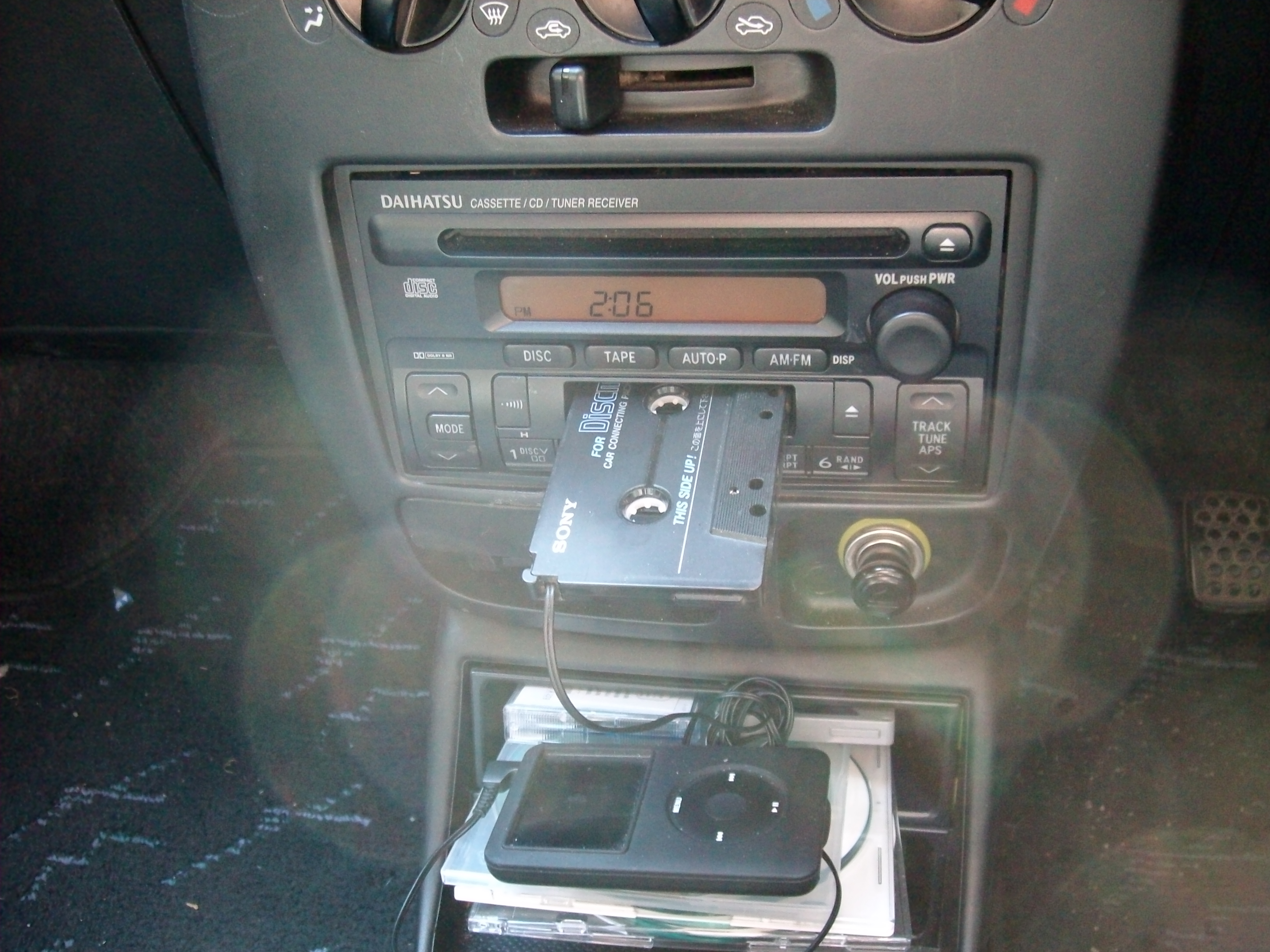
Cassette adapters are typically used in vehicles

A cassette adapter could also be used with other audio equipment, such as a microphone, handheld game console, or laptop computer. It can also be used in a home tape deck to play sound from any equipment, such as a personal computer, when computer speakers are in short supply.

- Hands-free cell phone, where a microphone and aux cable are connected to the cassette tape which broadcasts the audio from the call to the car's speakers
- CD player (the original application for cassette adapters)
- FM radio
- HD radio (for the large numbers of receivers that do not natively support this broadcast standard)
- Laptop computer
- Portable media players (e.g. iPod)

== Alternatives ==
A common alternative to cassette adapters are personal FM transmitters, usually for vehicles with AM/FM systems but no cassette playback. These devices often require external power and convert the device's electrical signal into radio waves which are then transmitted over an unused FM frequency to a nearby FM tuner, so is more prone to interference compared to cassette adapters.

== See also ==
- FlashPath
- Vehicle audio
