= FlashPath =

Series of devices

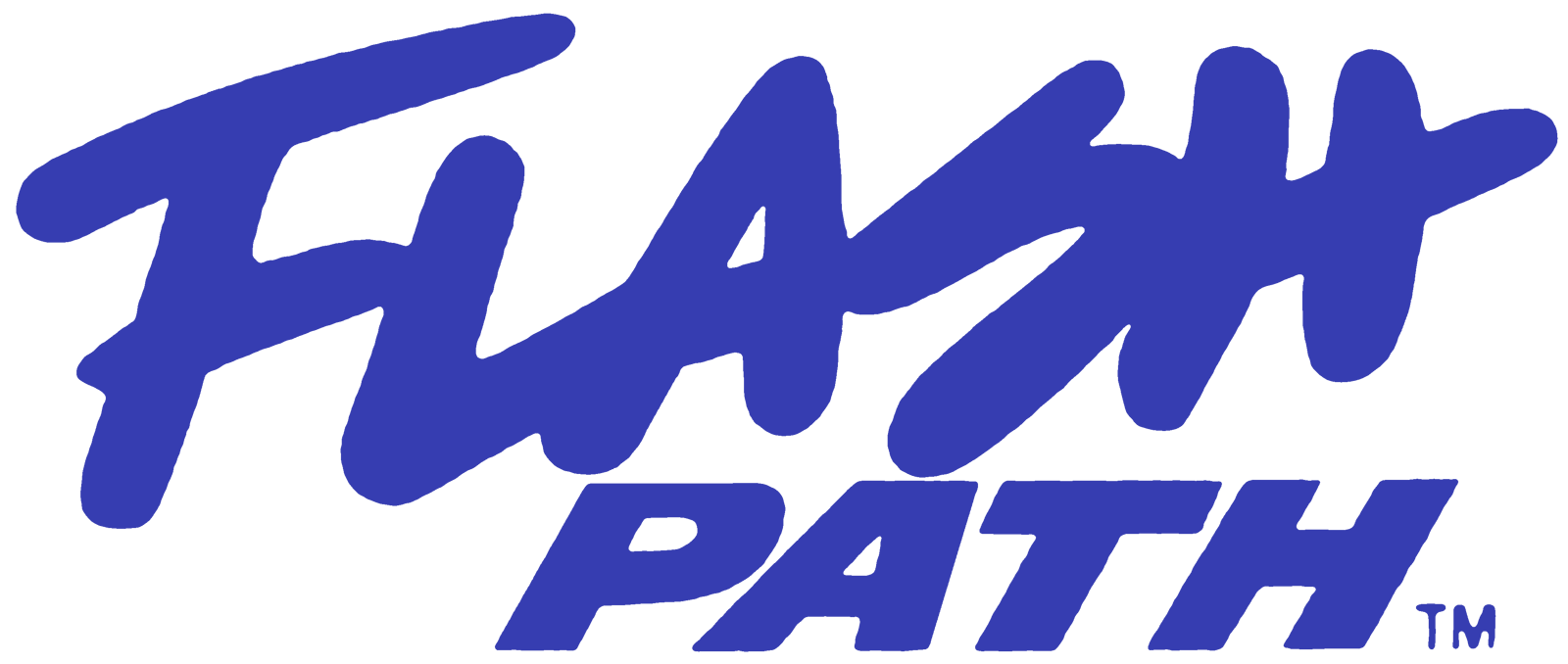
FlashPath

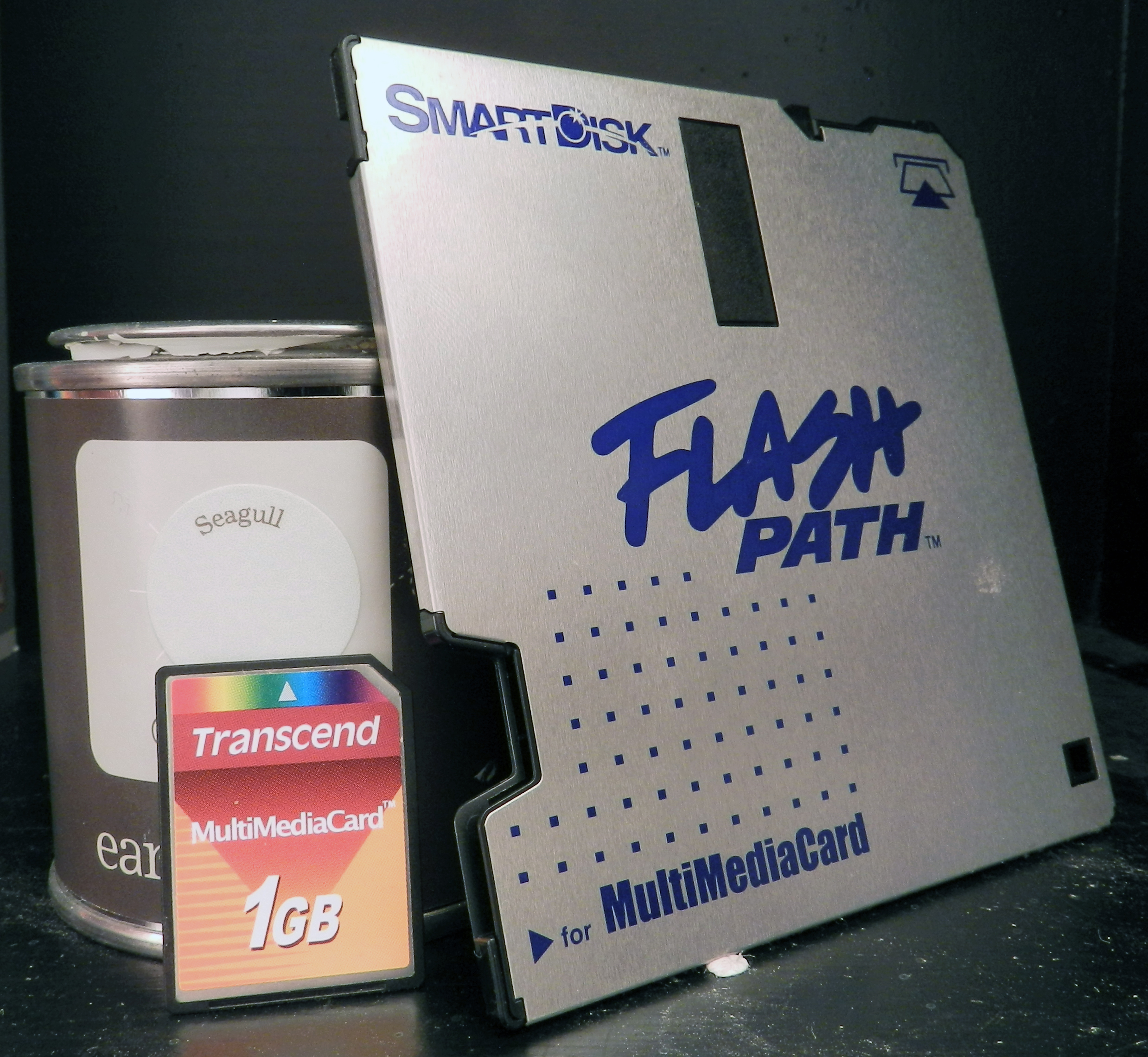
A SmartDisk FlashPath adaptor and MultiMediaCard.

FlashPath were a series of devices produced by the American company SmartDisk, which allowed a variety of memory cards to be used in a 3.5" Floppy disk drive. The initial version introduced in May 1998 allowed SmartMedia cards to be used with a floppy drive. Later, Memory Stick and Secure Digital/Multi Media Card versions were made as well.

FlashPath adapters were sold both branded by SmartDisk, and as OEM devices under other brand names.

FlashPath is hardware compatible with all standard 3.5" High-Density Floppy disk drives, but is not a drop-in replacement for real floppy disks. A special software device driver must be installed on the computer that is to access data via FlashPath. Thus, FlashPath is only usable with computers and operating systems for which such a driver exists and can be installed.

SmartDisk was sued by PC Connector Solutions over alleged U.S. patent infringement by SmartDisk's Smarty and FlashPath products in 2000. However, the court ruled in favor of SmartDisk; a final ruling was made in 2005.

In 2007, SmartDisk sold its intellectual property assets to Verbatim. The company issued a new set of patent infringement lawsuits in 2008. However, since the product was already effectively obsolete by then, most computer users were not affected by the lawsuits.

== See also ==
- Cassette tape adaptor
- Digital cameras
