= CMC Magnetics =

Taiwanese optical disc manufacturer

CMC Magnetics Corporation
- Native name: 中環股份有限公司
- Type: Public
- Traded as: TWSE: 2323
- ISIN: TW0002323003
- Industry: Digital media
- Founded: 1978; 48 years ago
- Headquarters: Taipei, Taiwan, ROC
- Website: www.cmcnet.com.tw

CMC Magnetics Corporation (Chinese: 中環股份有限公司, Central Ring Public Limited Company) is a Taiwanese company that manufactures optical discs. Established in 1978, its factories are located in Taiwan (Memorex, HP, Philips, TDK, Maxell) and Hong Kong (Memorex, Philips). In December 2015, Taiyo Yuden, one of the inventors of the recordable CD and inventor of the original cyanine dye for CD-R, sold its optical disc brand and intellectual property to CMC Magnetics, ending its own production in Japan.

== Products ==
CMC produces CD and DVD storage media products, including CD-R, CD-RW, DVD-R/RW, DVD+R/RW, DVD-RAM, and floppy diskettes. CMC produces the Mr. Data line of optical media, which is or was commonly rebranded and sold by HP, Maxprint, Imation, Memorex, Philips, TDK, BenQ, Verbatim Life Series, Staples, Office Depot, Platinum, Datamax, Optimum, Auchan and other OEM brands.

After Taiyo Yuden sold its optical disc manufacturing business, CMC started the CMC Pro line of optical media, a new line of optical media based on the Taiyo Yuden technology that CMC acquired after Taiyo Yuden left the optical disc market.

== CMC in the UK and Ireland ==
Europa Magnetics Corporation Limited, a CMC group company, operated floppy disk, CD-ROM and CD-R production facilities in Cramlington, Northumberland, England in the 2000s.

CMC also operated a CD-R production plant, MC Infonics in Limerick, Ireland, which it had previously acquired from Mitsubishi Chemical/Verbatim.

== See also ==
- List of companies of Taiwan
