= Verbatim (company) =

American company producing memory media in the IT sector

Verbatim Corporation

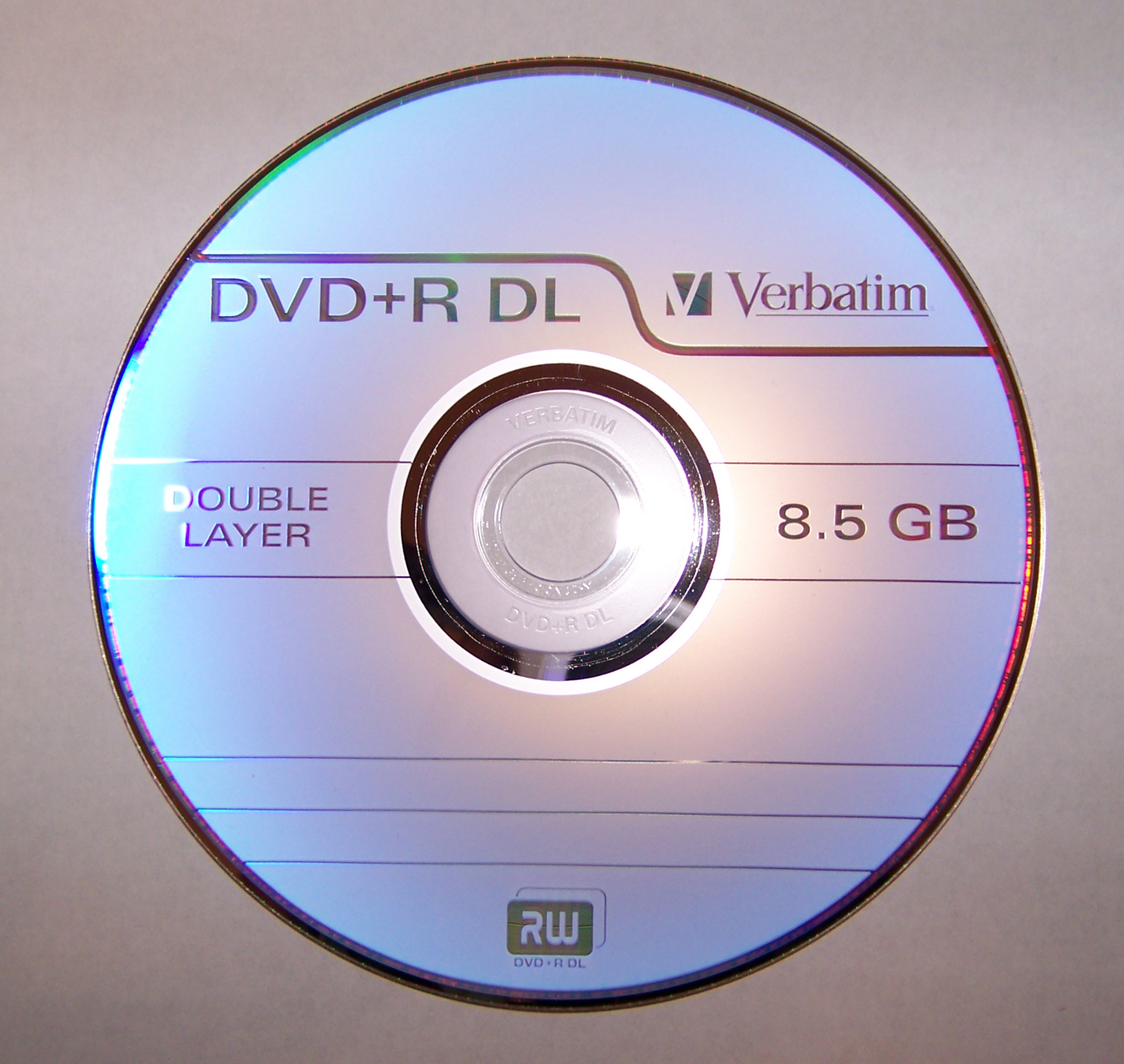
- Verbatim DVD
- Formerly: Information Terminals Corporation (1969–1978)
- Type: Private
- Industry: Electronics
- Founded: April 28, 1969; 57 years ago
- Founder: Reid Anderson
- Headquarters: Charlotte, North Carolina, United States
- Area served: Worldwide
- Key people: Clive Alberts (CEO and President)
- Products: Storage medias; Flash memories
- Owner: CMC Magnetics (100%; 2020–present); Mitsubishi (100%; 1990–2020); Kodak (100%; 1985–1990)
- Number of employees: 510 (consolidated)
- Parent: CMC Magnetics (2020–present); Mitsubishi (1990–2020); Kodak (1985–1990)
- Subsidiaries: SmartDisk (100%); Freecom (100%)
- Website: www.verbatim.com

Verbatim Corporation is an American company for storage media and flash memory products. Originally known for its floppy disks in the 1970s and 1980s, Verbatim is now known for its recordable optical media.

Founded in 1969 as Information Terminals Corporation, the company was acquired by Kodak in 1985 and sold to Mitsubishi in 1990. In 2020 Verbatim was sold to CMC Magnetics at an estimated price of $32 million USD.

== History ==
The company started in Mountain View, California, in 1969, under the name Information Terminals, founded by Reid Anderson. It grew quickly and became a leading manufacturer of floppy disks by the end of the 1970s, and it was soon renamed Verbatim. In 1982, it formed a floppy disk joint venture with Japanese company Mitsubishi Kasei (forerunner of Mitsubishi Chemical), with the joint venture called Kasei Verbatim.

Former Verbatim logo, 1978–2007

Verbatim was purchased by Kodak in 1985, while its floppy partnership with Mitsubishi Kasei was still intact. It was eventually purchased fully by Mitsubishi Kasei in March 1990, after eight years in a joint venture. Many new products were launched under the new Japanese ownership, and the brand saw immense growth in the decade. Mitsubishi Kagaku Media was founded in October 1994 as a subsidiary through the merger of Mitsubishi Kasei and Mitsubishi Petrochemical, resulting in Mitsubishi Chemical.

The company sold products under the Mitsubishi brand in Japan from 1994 to 2010, when Verbatim fully replaced it.

=== Key dates ===
- 1969: Information Terminals was founded in Mountain View, California, U.S.
- 1976: Information Terminals began manufacturing magnetic tape for use in its cassettes and floppy disks.
- 1978: Information Terminals was officially renamed Verbatim.
- 1979: Verbatim went public; sales grew to $36 million.
- 1985: Kodak announced its $174 million bid for Verbatim.
- 1990: Mitsubishi Kasei acquired Verbatim.
- 1992: The company acquired Carlisle Memory Products.
- 1994: Mitsubishi Kasei and Mitsubishi Petrochemical merged to create Mitsubishi Chemical, and a new subsidiary, Mitsubishi Kagaku Media, was founded. Verbatim brand was replaced by Mitsubishi in Japan.
- 1994: Verbatim entered a joint venture with Sanyo Laser Products.
- 1995: Acquired Laser Technologies and Ecotone.
- 2007: Acquired SmartDisk.
- 2009: Acquired Freecom
- 2009: Verbatim brand returned to the Japanese market for the first time since 1994.
- 2010: Mitsubishi Kagaku Media unified all recordable discs products under one umbrella Verbatim brand in the Japanese market.
- 2019: Agreement to be bought by CMC Magnetics.
- 2020: CMC Magnetics acquired Verbatim.

=== Notable info about historical products ===
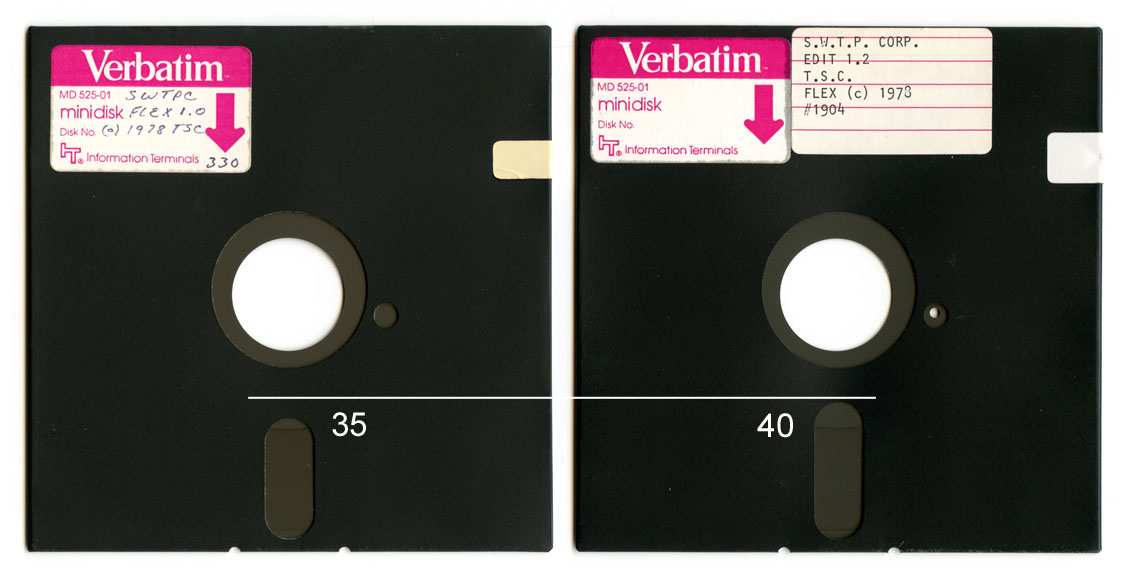
A pair of 5.25" floppy disks from 1978

- In 1969, the first digital-grade tape cassettes were released.
- 8" diskettes were first released in 1974.
- In 1991, Verbatim released the world's first 3.5" magneto-optical disk.
- Verbatim started its successful foray into the optical disc market in 1993 with CD-R media.
- In 1997, Verbatim released the world's first CD-RW format media.
- In 2001, Verbatim released the world's first DVD+R format media.
- Introduced the first 8.5 GB DVD+R DL products in 2004, followed by DVD-R DL in 2005.
- Verbatim launched a new product range of LED lights in 2010.
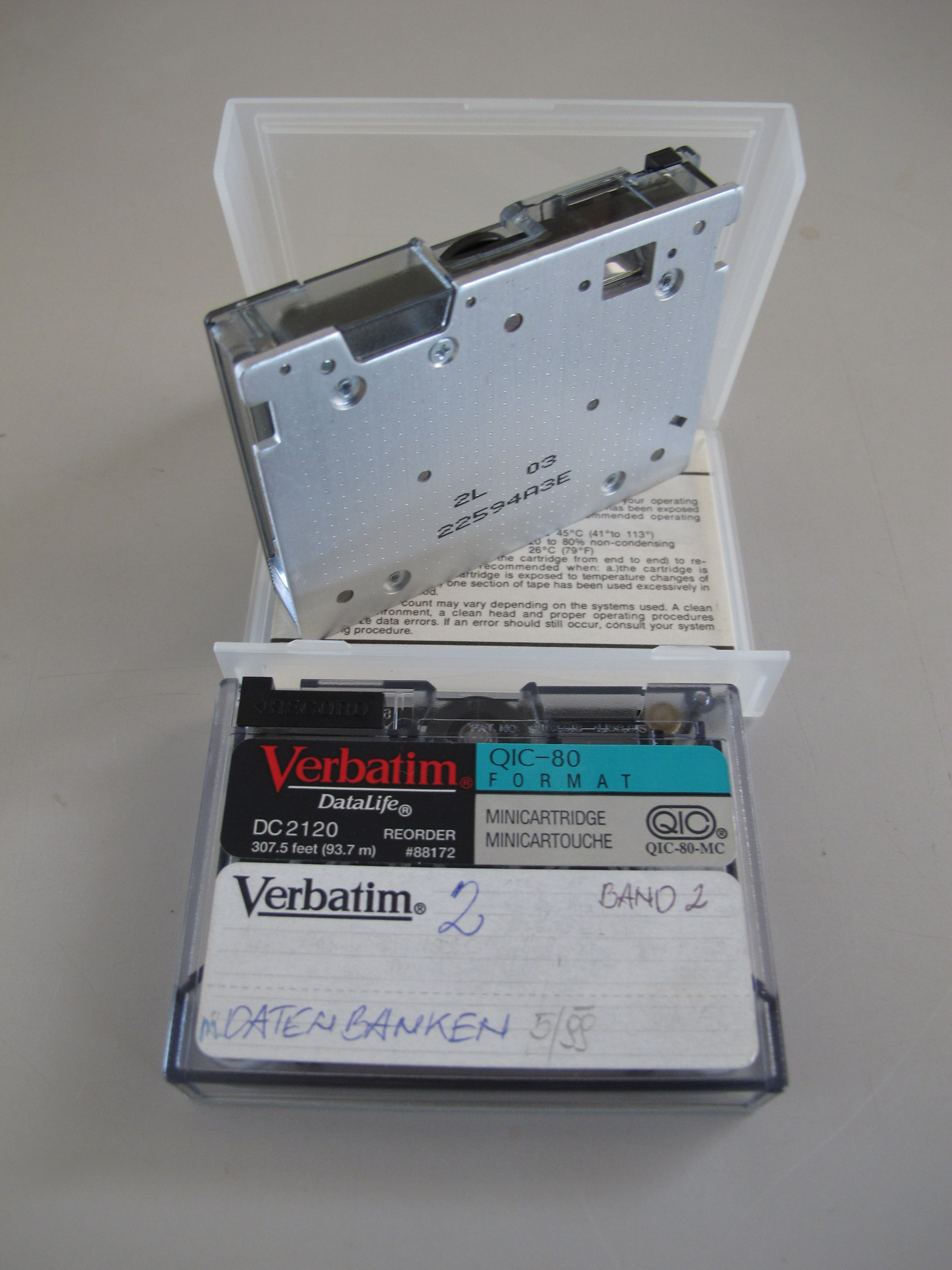
Minidata Cartridge formatted for Iomega Tape 250, 1999

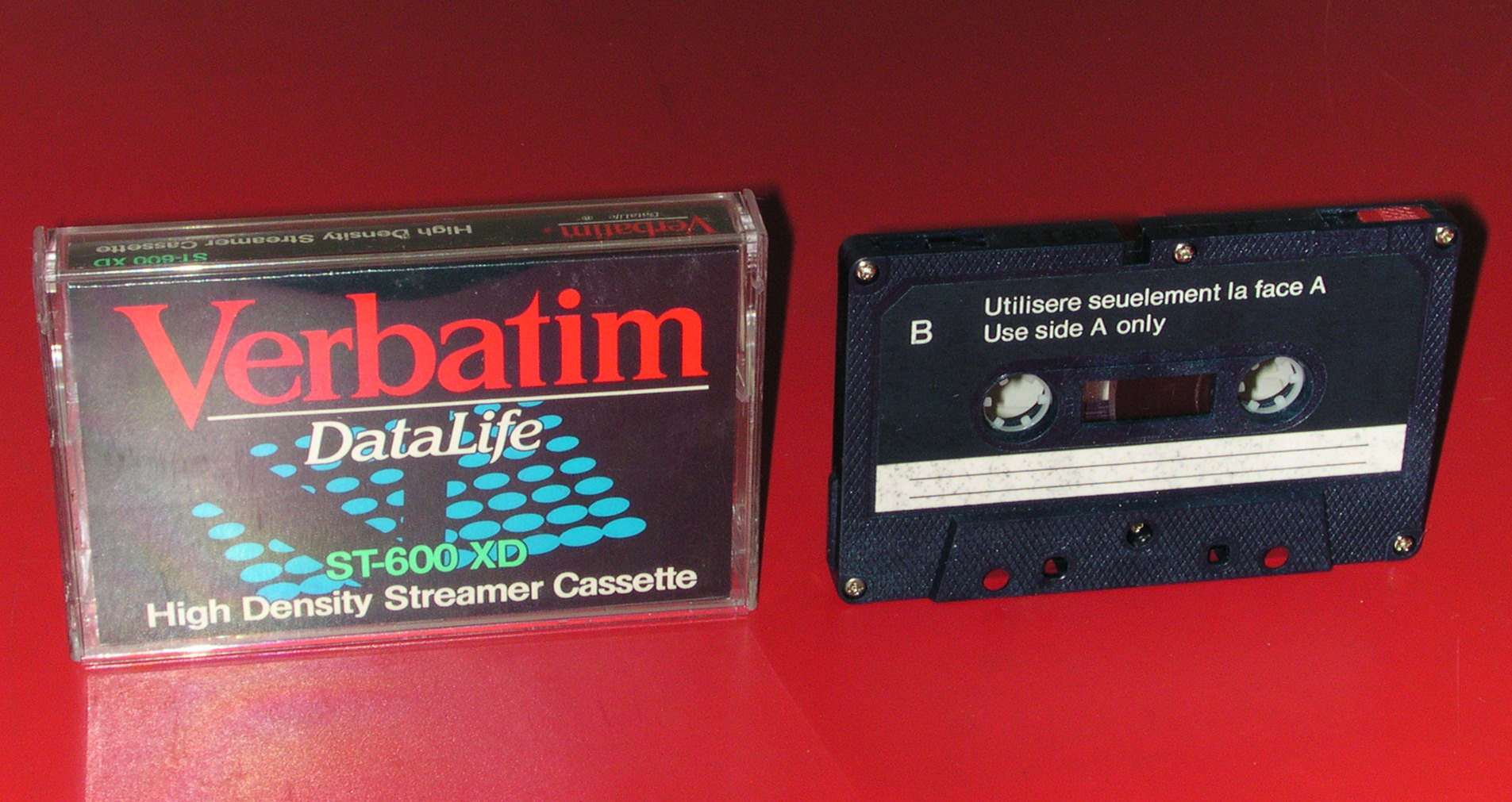
Verbatim ST 600 XD High Density Streamer Cassette

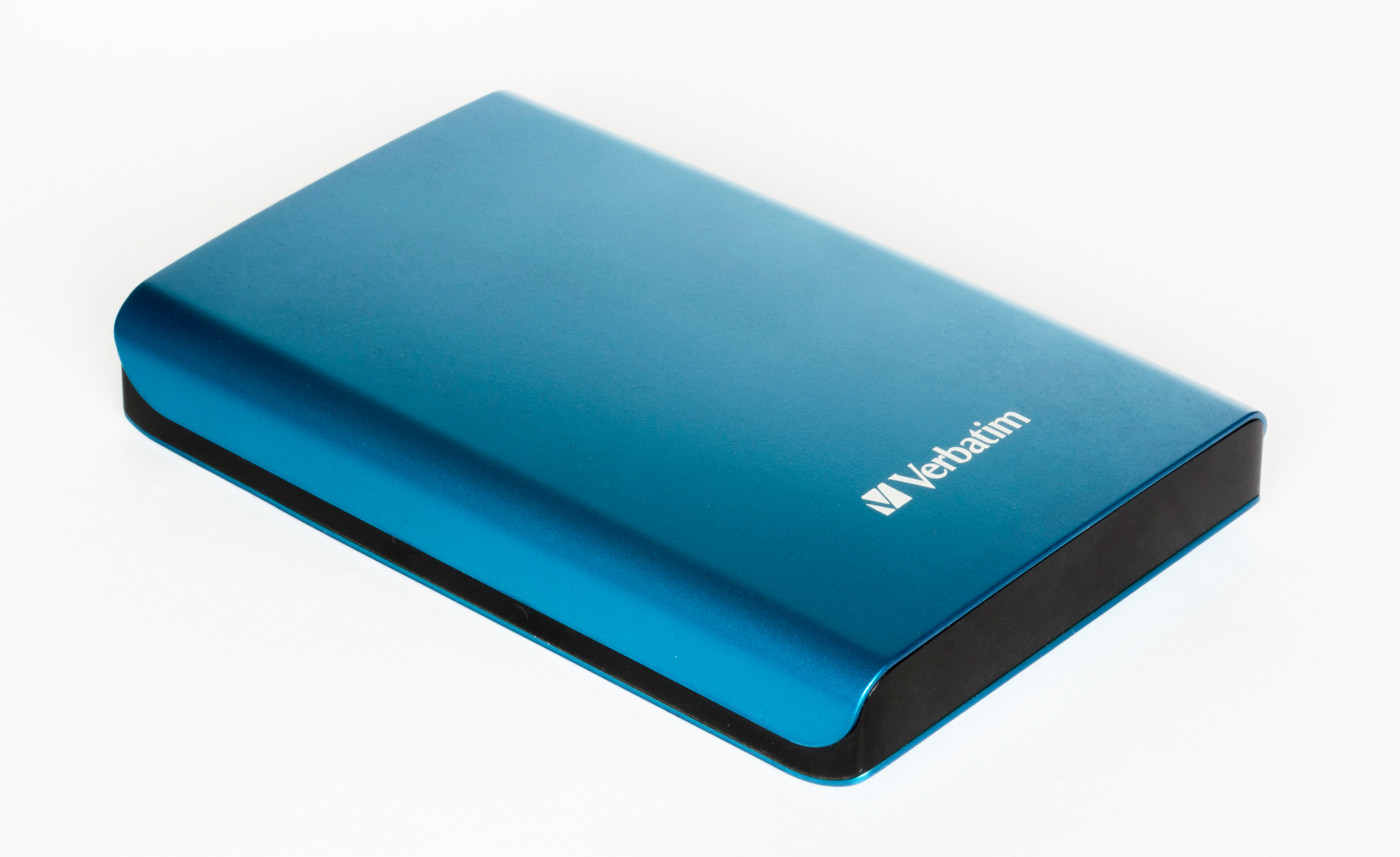
An external HDD, 2015

== Products ==
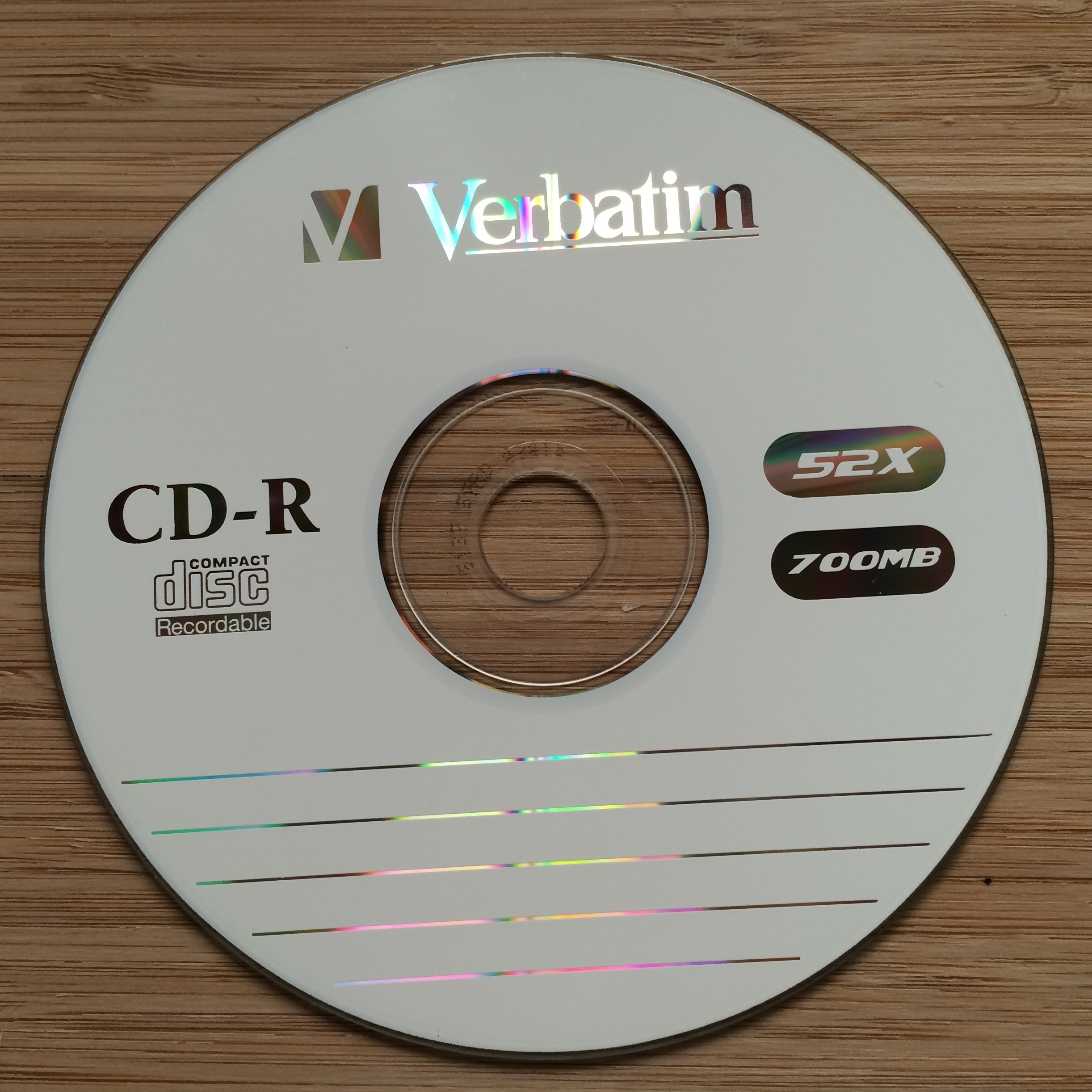
A standard 700 MB CD-R from the 2000s

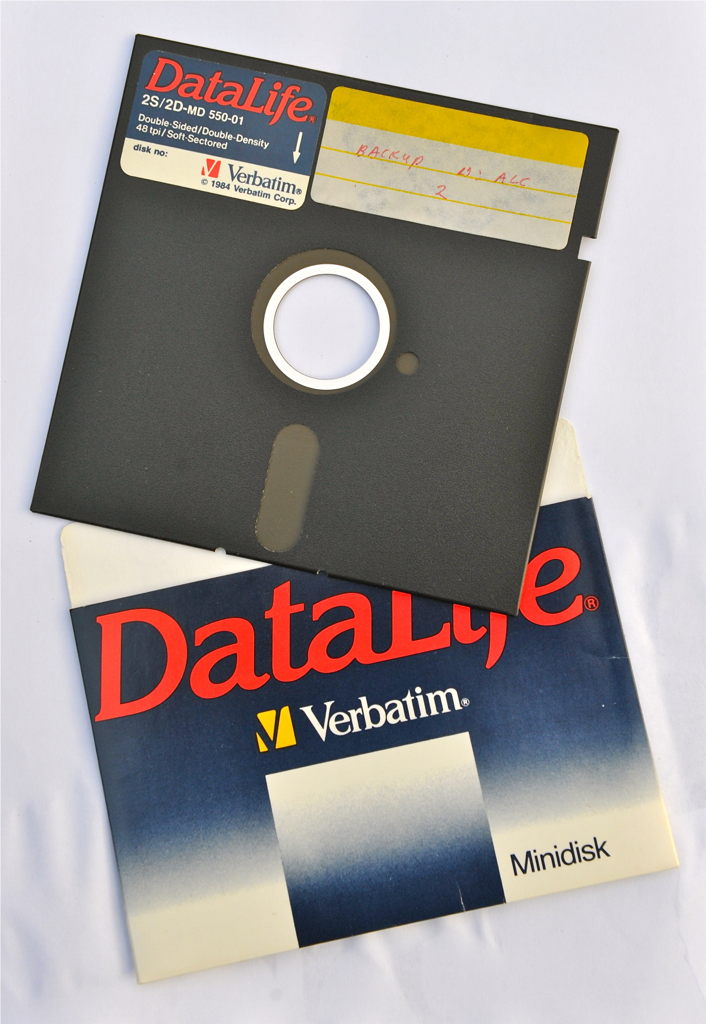
A 5.25" DataLife floppy from 1984

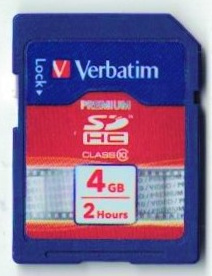
A 4 GB Verbatim SDHC card from 2012

=== Current and former products ===
- Solid-state drives (SSDs)
- Floppy disks
- Magnetic tapes
- MultiMediaCards
- SD cards
- CompactFlash cards
- CD-R
- Digital Vinyl CD-R
- CD-RW
- DVD-R
- DVD-RW
- DVD-R DL
- DVD+R
- DVD+RW
- DVD+R DL
- DVD-RAM
- BD-R
- BD-RE
- HD-DVD-R
- USB flash drives
- SIPRELAY Operators
- LED light bulbs
- Gaming Accessories
- Computer mouse
- Keyboards

=== Manufacturing and marketing ===
Verbatim's early floppies were manufactured at a factory in Limerick, Republic of Ireland, starting 1979 (MC Infonics, sold to CMC Magnetics in the 2000s).

As of 2006 (during the era of Mitsubishi ownership), Verbatim sold products partly produced in Verbatim and Mitsubishi's own plants in Singapore and Japan, and partly under license by Taiwanese and Indian manufacturers.

As of 2006, Verbatim also resold relabeled products from Japanese, Taiwanese, Chinese, Malaysian and Indian factories (Pearl White DVD series in Europe, some CD-R not labeled Super Azo), including but not limited to products by Taiyo Yuden, Ritek Corporation, CMC Magnetics, Prodisc, Moser Baer, Daxon/BenQ.

=== Technologies ===
- Teflon coating for floppy disks
- Advanced Azo Dye Technology (patented Azo-Color technology), first developed 1994
- SERL (Super Eutectic Recording Layer) technology for rewritable media (after deleting the medium it regenerates)
- TERL (Tellurium Alloy Recording Layer) technology for special audio CD-RWs
- MABL for Blu-ray discs

== See also ==
- List of optical disc manufacturers
