= Holographic Versatile Disc =

Novel optical disc based on holography

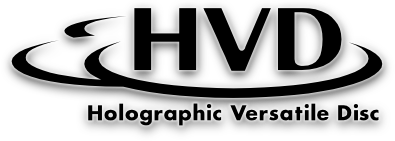

- An HVD by Optware
- Media type: Ultra-high density optical disc
- Capacity: 3.9 TB
- Developed by: HSD Forum
- Usage: Data storage, high-definition video, QHD/WQHD, possibility of Ultra HD

The Holographic Versatile Disc (HVD) was a proposed optical disc technology designed to store up to several terabytes of data on a 10 cm or 12 cm diameter disc. Development began in April 2004, but the project was ultimately abandoned due to funding issues. One of the companies responsible for its development went bankrupt in 2010.

The smaller disc size was aimed to reduce costs and materials used. It employs a technique known as collinear holography, whereby a blue-green and red laser beam are collimated in a single beam. The blue-green laser read data encoded as laser interference fringes from a holographic layer near the top of the disc. A red laser is used as the reference beam to read servo information from a regular CD-style aluminium layer near the bottom. Servo information is used to monitor the position of the read head over the disc, similar to the head, track, and sector information on a conventional hard disk drive. On a CD or DVD this servo information is interspersed among the data. A dichroic mirror layer between the holographic data and the servo data reflects the blue-green laser while letting the red laser pass through. This prevents interference from refraction of the blue-green laser off the servo data pits and is an advance over past holographic storage media, which either experienced too much interference, or lacked the servo data entirely, making them incompatible with current CD and DVD drive technology .

Standards for 100 GB read-only holographic discs and 200 GB recordable cartridges were published by ECMA in 2007 but no further holographic disc product has ever appeared in the market. A number of release dates were announced, all since passed, likely due to the actual high costs of the drives and discs, lack of compatibility with existing or new standards, and competition from more established optical disc Blu-ray and video streaming.

== Technology ==
Holographic Versatile Disc structure: 1. Green writing/reading laser (532 nm); 2. Red positioning/addressing laser (650 nm); 3. Hologram (data)(shown here as brown); 4. Polycarbonate layer; 5. Photopolymeric layer (data-containing layer); 6. Distance layers; 7. Dichroic layer (reflecting green light); 8. Aluminium reflective layer (reflecting red light); 9. Transparent base; P. Pit pattern (Illustration is not to scale.)

Current optical storage saves one bit per pulse, and the HVD alliance hoped to improve this efficiency with capabilities of around 60,000 bits per pulse in an inverted, truncated cone shape that has a 200 μm diameter at the bottom and a 500 μm diameter at the top. High densities are possible by moving these closer on the tracks: 100 GB at 18 μm separation, 200 GB at 13 μm, 500 GB at 8 μm, and most demonstrated of 5 TB for 3 μm on a 10 cm disc.

The system used a green laser, with an output power of 1 watt which is high power for a consumer device laser. Possible solutions include improving the sensitivity of the polymer used, or developing and commoditizing a laser capable of higher power output while being suitable for a consumer unit.

== Competing technologies ==
HVD is not the only technology in high-capacity, holographic storage media.

InPhase Technologies was developing a rival holographic format called Tapestry Media, which they claimed would eventually store 1.6 TB with a data transfer rate of 120 MB/s, and several companies are developing TB-level discs based on 3D optical data storage technology. Such large optical storage capacities compete favorably with the Blu-ray Disc format.

In 2006, holographic drives were projected to initially cost around US$15,000, and a single disc around US$120–180, although prices were expected to fall steadily. InPhase Technologies was unable to deliver their promised product as they ran out of funds and went bankrupt in 2010.

== Holography System Development Forum ==
The Holography System Development Forum (HSD Forum; formerly the HVD Alliance and the HVD FORUM) is a coalition of corporations purposed to provide an industry forum for testing and technical discussion of all aspects of HVD design and manufacturing.

As of March 2012, the following companies are members of the forum:

- CBCGroup
- Daicel
- FujiFilm
- Konica Minolta Inc.
- Kyoeisha
- Pulstec
- Shibaura Mechatronics Corporation
- Oracle Corporation
- Teijin Chemicals Ltd.
- Tokiwa Optical Corporation

As of March 2012, the following companies are supporting companies of the forum:

- Kodate Laboratory

== Standards ==
On December 9, 2004, at its 88th General Assembly, the standards body Ecma International created Technical Committee 44, dedicated to standardizing HVD formats based on Optware's technology.

On June 11, 2007, TC44 published the first two HVD standards: ECMA-377, defining a 200 GB HVD "recordable cartridge" and ECMA-378, defining a 100 GB HVD-ROM disc. Its next stated goals were 30 GB HVD cards and submission of these standards to the International Organization for Standardization for ISO approval.

== General Electric ==
General Electric Global Research Centers created a holographic disc that could hold many times the data of a Blu-Ray — up to 500 GB. As the technology is quite similar to CD, DVD, and Blu-ray technologies, the players were to be cross-compatible with these formats.

== See also ==
- DVD
- Compact Disc
- Blu-ray
- HD DVD
- Ultra Density Optical (UDO)
- Archival Disc
- Optical Disc Archive (ODA)
- Professional Disc for DATA (PDD or ProDATA)
- Holographic memory
- 3D optical data storage
- Magneto-optical drive (MO)
- Holographic Versatile Card
- Stacked Volumetric Optical Disk (SVOD)
- InPhase Technologies
