= Optical Disc Archive =

Storage technology

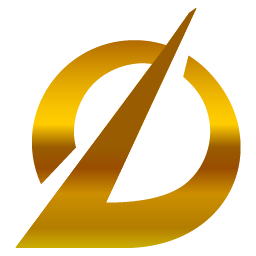

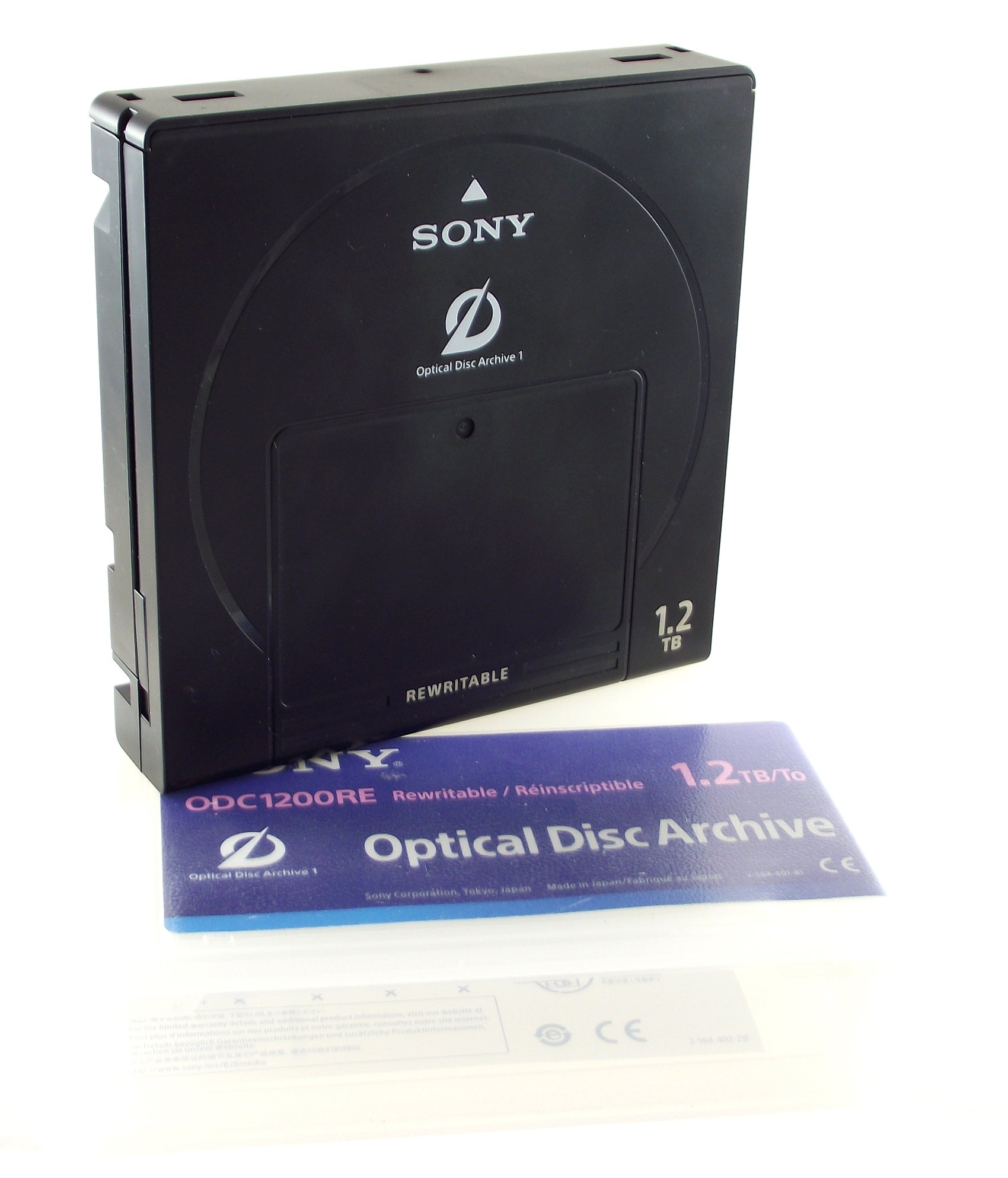
- Media type: Optical disc
- Encoding: WORM (write once)
- Capacity: 300GB~5.5 TB (per cartridge)
- Write mechanism: Optical Blu-ray Laser (405nm)
- Standard: UDF (Universal Disc Format)
- Developed by: Sony Corporation
- Manufactured by: Sony, TDK, Panasonic
- Usage: Digital Data Archival (50~100+ Years)
- Released: 2012

Optical Disc Archive (ODA) is an archival storage technology developed by Sony. A single cartridge is designed to hold as many as 12 optical discs, each of which are similar to, but not directly compatible with, Blu-ray or Blu-Ray-BDXL systems, with total capacities per cartridge as high as 5.5 TB. Fabrication of the optical discs is licensed to TDK but primarily fabricated and developed by Sony and Panasonic.

It is part of Sony's proprietary PetaSite data archival library system, which was based on SAIT2 & LTO2 linear tape drives, in partnership with IBM from 1998~2012, when it was phased out for optical based media. Marketed as a longer life and more durable competitor to the popular tape based Linear Open Tape (LTO) storage systems using a similar removable cartridge system, where each cartridge holds 12 optical discs, or 6,420 discs per 42U rack, the first generation were single sided discs and re-writable up to 1.5 TB using Sony's well known Professional Disc used in XDCAM cameras and on-site archival. The generation 3 version of the cartridge, using the Sony and Panasonic jointly developed archival discs (AD) each cartridge has a total capacity of 5.5 TB. This uses 11 optical discs, 3 layers on each side, at 500 GB per disc, with next generation planned to reach 1 TB a disc or 12 TB a cartridge.

== Overview ==
Sony Optical Archive is marketed as an offline, online, nearline, cold archival and one way data storage solution for broadcasting, education, and legal institutions for long term scaled use and easy digital access.

Media and hardware lifecycle and reliability benefits compared to tape-based media include the elimination of friction-induced media and tape-head wear and shedding, and a humidity-proof polycarbonate media substrate (similar to M-Disc) which is not affected by electromagnetic/gamma/alpha radiation, most chemicals or fluid contaminants. Lastly, the usage of a standard 405 nm optical laser (The same as used in current Blu-ray & Blu-Ray BDXL reader/writers) helps ensure long-term hardware component availability to facilitate long-term data retrieval.

Along with its large data storage capacity, this makes the format ideal for protection of large datasets against unexpected events like natural disasters. For example, since the 2011 Tōhoku earthquake and tsunami and the cessation of production of the HDCAM & HDCAM SR master format as well as a broadcast industry migration to file based digital media delivery, this overall resulted in a higher demand for reliable backup and digital access to media libraries leading to wide adoption of the Optical Archive system in Japan for backup of 4K and HDR content.

The Optical Archive cartridge system can be used on the desktop, or in scaled networked storage using the PetaSite optical jukebox. The storage jukeboxes take up 7U of standard rackmount space with 30 a cartridge master unit (ODS-L30M) and 60 cartridge (ODS-L60E) and 100 (ODS-L100E) cartridge expansion units for a combined total of 535 cartridges or 6,420 discs per 42U rack, equaling a current 2.9425 PB of total storage (Using 5.5 TB cartridges).

== History and development ==
In 1996, "PetaSite" was trade marked by Sony Kabushiki Kaisha. (renewed in 2018)

In 2001, PetaSite was announced to the global market.

In 2004, the CSM60, CSM100, CSM200 with 50~108 TB via SAIT2/LTO2 tape cartridges was launched.

In 2006, Sony & NEC start a joint venture in Optical Archives and Blu-ray/DVD reader/writer units.

2009~Current IBM/Sony stop sale of the CSM and SAIT2/LTO2 based systems, still providing service support for existing systems.

In 2012 Optical switchover Sony released their first desktop ODA cartridge readers for consumer/prosumer desktop use (USB 3.0 Type B) during the NAB Show with the first units shipping in February 2013 shifting the PetaSite brand entirely to optical based media.

Sony Corporation and Panasonic Corporation announced on 10 March 2014 their cooperation in producing a new media trademarked as Archival Disc. The Archival Disc media will be used in future Optical Disc Archive Media to achieve at least 12 TB of storage.

In 2015 Sony strategically acquired Optical Archive Inc. that was owned by Frank Frankovsky, giving Sony technology for current automatic store and retrieval systems, the foundation of the modular 7U rack-mount based system PetaSite uses today.

In 2020, Sony released the third generation system, with new 5.5 TB cartridges and an updated capability to the PetaSite ecosystem alongside desktop readers with USB Type-C 3.2 interfaces. The read speed is increased to 375 MB/s and the write speed (with verification on) to 187.5 MB/s.

In 2023, the Sony web site shows all of the ODA drives and PetaSite libraries as discontinued products.

In 2024, Sony confirmed that the product will not be further developed.

== Cartridge media ==
Product	Introduced	Gen.	Capacity (GB)	Write Type
ODC300R	2013	1	300	Write-Once
ODC300RE	2013	1	300	Rewritable
ODC600R	2013	1	600	Write-Once
ODC600RE	2013	1	600	Rewritable
ODC1200RE	2013	1	1200	Rewritable
ODC1500R	2013	1	1500	Write-Once
ODC3300R	2016	2	3300	Write-Once
ODC5500R	2019	3	5500	Write-Once

== Hardware ==
The PetaSite system, like LTO, consists of reading/writing bays for data access and storage bays for non-active storage.

Product	Introduced	Category	Maximum Number of Drives	Number of Slots	Reads Media Generation	Writes Media Generation
ODS-D55U	2013	Stand Alone Drive	1	N/A	1	1
ODS-D77U	2014	Stand Alone Drive	1	N/A	1	1
ODS-D280U	2016	Stand Alone Drive	1	N/A	1,2	2
ODS-D380U	2019	Stand Alone Drive	1	N/A	1,2,3	2,3
ODS-L10	2013	Small Library	2	10	1	1
ODS-L30M	2014	Library Master	2	30	1,2,3	1,2,3
ODS-L60E	2014	Library Extender	4	61	1,2	1,2
ODS-L100E	2014	Library Extender	0	101	n/a	n/a
PetaSite EX Master Module	2019	Library Master	21	912	1,2,3	2,3
PetaSite EX Cartridge Extension Module	2019	Library Extender	0	816	n/a	n/a
PetaSite EX Drive Extension Module	2019	Library Extender	21	96	1,2,3	2,3

The PetaSite system has datacenter interconnect systems via Copper (Ethernet 1~10GbE) or Fiber Optical links (SFP+ 10GbE~100GbE) with desktop interfaces using USB 3.2 Gen 2 (20 Gbit/s) with 19.5v DC power.

== Software ==
Sony Optical Archive & PetaSite uses a content management software simply called File Manager currently in its second major revision "File Manager 2"

The commercial software suite is built around and uses open-source software primarily Java, Apache Tomcat, and the open source MariaDB.

The OTA archival system is supported by a few 3rd party media asset management platforms notably Square Box.

== Commercial adoption of PetaSite ==
=== Optical (since 2012) ===
In 2009, Sony delivered an XDCAM disc based data archive solution to RaceTech, UK, which aims to improve the operational workflow between the "at track" OB trucks and the central headquarters operation. This allowed RaceTech to digitally record and archive over 1,400 professional horse race days, which equates to in excess of 9,000 races and over 7,000 hours of recorded material in the UK every year.

In 2016 Nagoya Television Broadcasting Co., Ltd. adopted the second generation of the PetaSite system for Digibeta and HDCAM digital archival.

In 2018, RayCom Sports adopted the third generation of Sony Optical Disc storing HDCAM, DVCPro and Betacam tapes alongside migrating their existing optical XDCAM archives using the Professional Disc

In 2017 Ishikawa Television Broadcasting Co., Ltd. adopted the second generation of the PetaSite system for on site and off-site backups.

In 2021 Montclair State University, alongside adopting Sony PTZ equipment adopted Sony's ODS-L30M PetaSite for on-site backup.

=== Tape based (1998 to 2012) ===
Sony PetaSite for the systems full 1998~2012 history before optical switch over.

In 1998 RAI 24, Italian broadcaster becomes the first western adopter of the Sony optical archive system using SAIT2 / LTO2 Media.

In 1999 Telemadrid, Spain adopts OTA for approximately 200,000 hours (350,000 tapes) of shelf based storage is managed by the archive system.

In 2000 publisuisse, Switzerland the first Europe based archive system is deployed for commercials

In 2001 CNN, North American broadcaster adopts the format for analogue and digital tape archival for over 120,000 hours of media.

In 2003 Beeld en Geluid, Netherlands alongside Blue Order and LogicaCMG phase in optical archival for the national audio/video archive of over 650,000 hours in various formats.

In 2004 NOB, Netherlands, holding 1,000 hours of Transmission Archive content.

In 2004 Rotana, Beirut, adopted Sony OTA to store a substantial tape library archive (4,000 - 5,000 Betacam tapes equivalent to 7,600 hours of content).

In 2005~2007 ITN, UK Sony was consulted in 2005 with adoption approved in 2007 for the ITN DAM Project ITN will grow their archive by 8,000 hours per year. (Archive System for Clip Sales and News).

In 2007 SIC, Portugal Sony OTA was adopted for scale to store approximately 12,000 hours.

In 2008 TV Valencia, Spain Archive System for News Transmission and Logging.

In 2008 RTP, Portugal adopted Sony PetaSite for Digital Asset Management (DAM) Project

In 2008 GMTV, UK Refurbishment of GMTV's production processes.

== See also ==
- Archival Disc
- Sony Professional Disc
- M-Disc
- Blu-ray
