= Optical jukebox =

Robotic data storage device

An optical jukebox is a robotic data storage device that can automatically load and unload optical discs from drives, such as CD, DVD, Blu-ray, or UDO to provide terabytes (TB) or petabytes (PB) of tertiary storage. Such systems are also called optical disk libraries, optical storage archives, robotic drives, disc changers, or autochangers. Jukeboxes can fit hundreds of discs in a desktop or 5U carousel box or thousands in a full-rack cabinet, and usually have a picking device that traverses the slots and drives. Arrangement of the slots and picking devices affects performance and maintenance costs, depending on the robotics design, the space between a disk and the picking device, and number of drives. Seek times and transfer rates vary depending upon the drive used.

Similar systems exist using other media, such as the magnetic cassette-based tape library.

== History and function ==
One of the first examples of an optical jukebox was the unit designed and built at the Royal Aerospace Establishment at Farnborough, England. The unit had twin read/write heads, 12" WORM disks and the carousels were pneumatically driven. It was produced to replace the 1/2 inch magnetic tape devices that were being used to store satellite data.

Jukeboxes are used in high-capacity archive storage environments such data centers and on-premise server rooms to store long-term data such as imaging, medical, compliance records, video and other high-value data assets, objects, and files. Hierarchical storage management is a strategy that moves little-used or unused files from fast magnetic storage to optical jukebox devices in a process called migration. If the files are needed, they are migrated back to magnetic disk. Optical disc libraries are also useful for making backups and in IT disaster recovery situations. Today one of the most important uses for jukeboxes is to archive data. Archival is different from backup in that the data is stored on media designed to last up to 100 years. The data is usually permanently written on Write Once Read Many (WORM)-type discs to prevent tampering.

Jukeboxes typically contain internal SCSI or SATA-based recordable drives (CD-R/RW, DVD-RAM, DVD±R/RW, MO, PD, UDO or BD-R/RE) that connect directly to a file server and are managed by a third-party jukebox management software. This software controls the movement of media within the jukebox, and the pre-mastering of data prior to the recording process.

Before the advent of the modern RAID SAN and much cheaper hard disks, high-volume storage on DVD was cheaper than magnetic disks. Jukebox densities have greatly increased with the release of the 128 gigabyte (GB) Blu-ray XL quadruple layer (BDXL QL) format, with a road-map to increase to eight layers and 200 GB per disc. The current format, used in a single 700-disc jukebox such as the DISC ArXtor7000 library, allows 89 TB of storage. Other jukeboxes like the TeraStack Solution can store up to 142 TB of online and nearline data with a nominal power draw of 425 watts, while the Zerras ICEBOX allows up to 25TB in a single unit library with a power draw of 60 watts per unit and scaling to 200TB in a 42U rack cluster. These units show the wide variance of design attributes. Such jukeboxes using bare commercial off-the-shelf Blu-ray discs differ from proprietary solutions such as Sony's Optical Disc Archive libraries, which use proprietary Archival Discs sealed in multi-disc cartridges incompatible with Blu-Ray drives and discs from the consumer market.

== Management software ==
The core functionality of optical library management software can be broken down into four parts: robotic control, filesystem authoring, file tracking, and access control.

=== Robotic control ===
All optical libraries comply with the standard SCSI command set. These commands are used for control and library geometry querying. When the management software is run, it will send inquiry requests to the optical library for the status of its contents. Number and type of drives, number and status of slots and other essential information is gathered. Following this, the management software may request data off of a particular piece of media or it may wish to perform some write operations on it. Any of these actions would require specific move commands sent from the management application to the optical library. An example of this would be to move media from slot 50 to the drive number 3.

=== Filesystem authoring ===
Optical library management software handles all of the writing and reading of the filesystem content on the optical medium. Once media has been placed in a drive from its home slot, many operations can be taken. For example: The creation of a UDF filesystem on blank media, the writing of a single file, or the reading of some data off of the filesystem on media.

Filesystem types available for optical media range from ISO standard technologies like UDF to proprietary formats.

=== File tracking ===
Optical library management software will often track the files and folders extant on a piece of optical media by means of a database. Any filesystem data pertaining to an individual media would be available in this database. For example: paths and names of files and folders, file sizes, and all of the metadata that a modern filesystem may keep.

=== Access control ===
Optical library management software makes itself available to the OS in an assortment of ways. One of these ways in a Windows environment, is by way of virtual drive letters. Essentially, the whole of an optical library can be viewed, read to and written to via a virtual filesystem while the management software handles all of the media movement and I/O requests invisibly in the background.

Another way that access to the optical library may be accomplished is by way of CIFS shares (more often seen with Unix-type optical library management applications).

== Access time issues ==
Unlike tape, and similarly to HDDs, optical discs are random access with millisecond seek times allowing easy search and multiple users when requests are confined to a given disc. Jukeboxes work best when only a few users need to access its library at the same time.

Small jukeboxes have only one or two CD, DVD, or Blu-ray drives, so users requesting simultaneous access to files on only one or two discs can share the jukebox at the same time. If additional users want to use a different disc, they have to wait for the disc to be swapped by the robots in the jukebox and the drive to spindown/spinup. This takes from 4 to 9 seconds. Larger jukeboxes have six or more drives, so more users can simultaneously access different discs at the same time.

A more efficient option is to have an HDD or SSD cache attached to the jukebox for a higher number of simultaneous users. This way, the configuration operates in a FILO (First In Last Out) manner, so files changed are only sent back to the optical discs after they have been used. Changes may or may not be saved or versioned based on the user configuration and accessibility settings on the storage management software that runs the optical jukebox. The drives will read and write the data to the RAID / disc cache and then present it to end users. This way the read time only occurs during the initial data read process, then the data is sent to the cache.
