= 3D memory =

3D memory may refer to:

- 3D optical data storage
- Three-dimensional memory cells
  - V-NAND (3D NAND) flash memory
- 3D integrated circuit (3D IC) memory chips
