= SVOD =

SVOD may refer to:

- Subscription video on demand (SVOD)
- Streaming video on demand (SVOD)
- Stacked Volumetric Optical Disc (SVOD)
- RSBN-2S Svod (avionics), a short range navigation system found on the Ilyushin Il-18
