= Eugene Levich =

Russian-Israeli physicist

Eugene V. (Yevgeny) Levich is a Russian-Israeli physicist known for work on the Bose–Einstein condensate and 3D optical data storage. Levich has published over 100 papers and book chapters in the fields of plasma physics, astrophysics, phase transitions, nonlinear phenomena and chaos, turbulence in fluids and plasma and geophysics. He also holds over 40 patents in fundamental fields of technology, ranging from managing of turbulent drag and heat exchange in turbulent flows to optical storage in consumer electronics.

== Early life and education ==
Levich was born in 1948 in Moscow, the son of Veniamin Levich. He obtained an MSc in physics in 1968, from Moscow State University and a PhD in theoretical physics from the Landau Institute of Theoretical Physics in 1970.

In 1972 he applied for an exit visa to leave to Israel, was denied permission to emigrate and joined the refusenik movement. After meeting with New York City mayor John Lindsay in Moscow, Levich was ordered into the Soviet army, and then in May, 1973 abducted and sent to a labor camp in the Siberian Arctic. His mother Tanya dictated an open letter to Richard Nixon and Leonid Brezhnev, while US politicians Benjamin Gilman and Bertram L. Podell expressed his support. The Bulletin of the Atomic Scientists published an open letter of support signed by 50 American and Canadian scientists. He was released in 1974 after international struggle and support from the West.

== Scientific career ==
Levich discovered, together with Yakov Borisovich Zel'dovich, the phenomenon of Bose–Einstein condensate in radiation and what is known now as one of the most important mechanisms of interaction between plasma and radiation in astrophysical conditions (MBH environs, quasars, pulsars and radio sources). His later works (together with V. Yakhot) paved way to a new direction in the theory of phase transitions-kinetics of phase transitions.

In 1975 Levich immigrated to Israel, along with his brother Aleksandr, even though his father was denied until 1978. He worked until 1978 as a senior scientist at the department of nuclear physics of the Weizmann Institute. In 1979-1980 he was a senior visiting fellow at the faculty of physics of Harvard University.

In 1981 Levich became associate professor and in 1985 professor of theoretical physics and professor of engineering at the City University of New York where he served till 1991. In 1982-1985 he was senior visiting fellow at the department of theoretical physics at the University of Oxford and visiting professor at Tel-Aviv University.

From 1982 on Levich was working on the theory of turbulence in fluids and plasma. He discovered and predicted, in parallel with professor of Cambridge University H.K. Moffatt FRS, totally unexpected structure and fundamental properties of turbulent flows in fluids and plasma that have bearing in particular on the issue of turbulence management and control in fluids and plasma.

In 1991-1996 Levich was chief scientist of Orlev Scientific Computing, a division of Ormat Industries Ltd., Israel. Orlev gathered together Israeli and US scientists trying to implement Levich's concept of turbulence control in industrial environment. However, the technological limitations of those years made difficult unambiguous confirmation of all the aspects of the theory. It was only 25 years after the first publication of the theory by Levich in 1983, that the theory found decisive support in independent experimental, observational, theoretical, and numerical studies, carried out in particular at NCAR (Boulder, Colorado), Cambridge University, Los Alamos and other scientific centers.

From 1996 to 1998 Levich was president and chief scientist of a private company Constellation Memory Devices Ltd., developing general principles of fluorescent 3D optical data storage. In 1999, Levich became president and chairman of the board of directors of Constellation 3D, Inc., which tried to commercialize the technology during the dot-com bubble for multilayer disks and cards in consumer electronics (high definition TV and digital cinema) and professional storage markets. The company had its initial public offering and its share price soared, but declared bankruptcy in 2002.

In 2002-2005 Levich was an independent consultant to several companies developing optical storage based on multilayer concepts. Levich served from 2005 until 2008 as director and chief technical officer New Medium Enterprises (NME) Inc., US public company which, like Constellation 3D, was working to bring multi-layer DVD-like disks to market. The Versatile Multilayer Disc had high storage capacities, but production costs similar to DVDs due to being compatible with existing manufacturing processes.

== Contributions to modern science ==
Levich and his team created and implemented totally novel technological principles for industrial production of large capacity carriers of information, optical discs in particular. These principles can be equally implemented for applications with red lasers and blue lasers, for pre-recorded replicated discs and recordable discs. Parts of the technology were implemented in a replication production line manufacturing 2, 3 and 4 layers optical discs (up to 20GB capacity red laser discs) built by the joint team of NME Inc. and the VDL-ODMS division of VDL Groep. This production line was unveiled to public in Eindhoven, Netherlands, on 22 January 2008.

In 2008–2009 Levich summarized the work that lasted for many years in the field of turbulence, which might be one of the most important discoveries in modern physics. This major work, Coherence in Turbulence: New Perspectives, was published in July 2009.This work has implications, in particular, for nuclear fusion technologies.

Afterwards, Levich started working in a commercial project in the field of nuclear fusion technologies. However many scientists in the world connect the works and concepts launched by Levich to a list of natural phenomena, such as plasma turbulence in solar wind, solar granulation, clustering of galaxies, heating of matter in quasars, pulsars, radio sources, Seyfert galaxies, and Bose condensation.

== Publications ==
- Levich, Yevgeny (1976). "Soviet dissidents: trying to keep in touch". Nature. 263 (5576): 366–367. Bibcode:1976Natur.263..366L. doi:10.1038/263366a0.
