= HVC =

HVC may refer to:

- HVC (avian brain region), an area in the avian brain involved in song production and vocal learning
- HVC ("Home Video Computer"), the product code used by Nintendo for Famicom hardware and software
- Haitian Vodou Culture Language (ISO 639-3 code)
- High-velocity cloud, a common astronomical phenomenon
- Himachal Vikas Congress, an Indian political party
- Holographic Versatile Card, a piece of computer hardware
- Hypervisor call, the interface between virtual machine software and a guest running under it.
- High-value chemicals, see high value products
