= Constellation 3D =

Defunct technology company

Constellation 3D (C3D) was a company developing a medium for 3D optical data storage, using the product names fluorescent multilayer disc (FMD) and fluorescent multilayer card (FMC).

== History ==
Constellation 3D Technology Limited was a development company, development that started in 1996. The company was formed in the British Virgin Islands, controlled by Irish company Constellation 3D Holdings Limited. Constellation 3D Technology Limited concentrated the R&D taking place in the United States, Israel, Russia, Ukraine and additional subcontractors in other countries. It held the intellectual property rights, later transferred to a subsidiary of its own in the United States. Constellation 3D Holdings was the holding entity for shareholders in the above-mentioned countries and others.

In 1999 as part of its efforts for raising funds for its development, since the company had millions of dollars in losses with no revenues, there was a reverse merge into C3D Inc., in Fort Lauderdale, Florida acquired its assets. The new C3D was formed with the name Latin Venture Partners on December 27, 1995. and changed to C3D Inc. on March 24, 1999, in anticipation of a proposed transaction with Constellation Holdings. From its inception until October 1, 1999, C3D had no business operations.

In November 1999 the company started reporting in accordance with the Securities Exchange Act of 1934

In parallel to the dot-com bubble near the end of 1999, the share price rose 31 fold in less than a year after a few private demonstrations. The dramatic rise in the price invited questions at the time, both outside the company and also inside it. As stated by a former director: "At the reverse merge Constellation 3D Technology received restricted shares. There were very few tradable shares in the hands of the shareholders of C3D Inc previous to the merge. The striking jumps in the price of the shares up and down made impossible the discussions with investors. These oscillations, and the following influence on the markets of the melting of the dot.com bubble kept the company always running after the dollar for financing the development"

In January 2000, the symbol for shares was changed to CDDDE after the company failed to comply with listing requirements. Following corrections reported on January 14, 2000, the symbol was changed to CFMD.

Its chairman was former chief of defense research for Israel, Brigadier General Itzhak Yaakov, president and CEO Eugene Levich, interim chief operating officer Michael Goldberg, and general manager of products Ingolf Sander. The company was headquartered in New York.

By early 2000, Yaakov was no longer chairman, and in 2001 (when he was 75 years old) it was reported that he had been arrested in Israel being accused for espionage. He was charged, and tried on two national security offenses: the first, and more severe charge, being “high espionage,” passing secret information with intent to harm national security, while the second, lighter one, was disclosing secret information to unauthorized people. Ya’tza was eventually acquitted by the district court of the more serious offense, but found guilty of the lesser charge. He was given a two-year suspended sentence and was immediately released. His arrest and trial became known in Israel as the “Ya’tza Affair.”

The company announced a demonstration at the COMDEX trade show in November 2000. Various numbers of layers were predicted. Besides a disk intended to store feature-length films at high definition, the company planned a ClearCard the size of a credit card that would store 5 to 10 gigabytes for use on a computer or other device.

By the end of 2000, the company was losing over $20 million a year, and still had no revenue. By early 2001, the company had offices in New York City and Massachusetts, with labs in California, Israel and Russia, and had an agreement with Lite-On for manufacturing. In August 2001 the company debuts First HDTV Compatible Fluorescent Multilayer Disc. Nonetheless, according to Sander, "C3D found a unique way for storing data in up to 20 layers using fluorescent materials - however stability problems in the material could not be overcome".

On November 17, 2001, Target Invest Consulting LLC, based in Switzerland, registered in Saint Kitts and Nevis, had agreed to a debt financing of $15 million, with a bridge load of $2 million, through Constellation 3D Technology Limited which provided collaterals for the bridge loan. By January, 2002, the financing was still not complete. In March, 2002, a manufacturing joint venture was announced with Russia-based Sistema called OAO Kontsern Nauchny Tsentr. However, about the same time the company started to cut staff after the funding was delayed.

Target Invest Consulting LLC reassured several times that the investment though delayed would take place, including such a confirmation sent to the SEC by the attorney of Target Invest Consulting LLC. Despite the reassurances, Target Invest Consulting LLC failed to fulfil its commitments. In April 2002 the internal legal advisor, Craig Weiner, and the chief financial officer Leonardo Berezowsky, reported to the Board that in the absence of the financing if the operations continue the company will be undertaking obligations that it won't be able to fulfil, with the consequent penalties. Under the said circumstances the Board decided to shut down the company. The company stopped all activities and on December 13, 2002, filed for bankruptcy, which was not completed until 2006.

A company called D Data Inc. acquired the entire patent portfolio of Constellation 3D in 2003, and promoted the technology under the new name of Digital Multilayer Disk (DMD). The digital multilayer disk promised six layers and some compatibility with red laser DVD players around 2005. D Data published a web site until about the time of the great recession of 2008.

Competitors included InPhase Technologies, which started demonstrating its own storage using holographic techniques around 2002. The high-definition optical disc format war resulted in a focus on the Blu-ray disk. Although some research on 3D disk formats continued, and the Versatile Multilayer Disc briefly promised ten layers, video streaming services eventually made the products no longer relevant by the 2010s. Some even mentioned this technology as one of the examples of vaporware, technologies developed but that were set aside as markets followed new different directions.
