= Versatile Multilayer Disc =

Failed format intended to compete with Blu-ray and HD DVD

VMD
- Media type: High-density optical disc
- Encoding: MPEG-2 and VC-1
- Capacity: Standard: 20 GB (4 layer), 5 GB per layer
- Developed by: New Medium Enterprises
- Usage: High-definition video

Versatile Multilayer Disc (VMD or HD VMD) was a high-capacity red-laser optical disc technology designed by New Medium Enterprises, Inc. VMD was intended to compete with the blue-laser Blu-ray Disc and HD DVD formats and had an initial capacity of up to 30 GB per side. At a physical level, VMD is identical to DVD, but with the possibility of using more layers.

== History ==
The company founded in Nevada as Shopoverseas.com on August 2, 1999, changed its name to New Medium Enterprises, Inc. (NME) on July 10, 2000. On April 20, 2001, it became a public company, with shares traded over-the-counter with symbol MNEN. On January 13, 2004 it acquired the intellectual property for multi-layer optical discs from MultiDisc Ltd. and TriGM International S.A, and became headquartered in London. On June 14, 2005, Rupert Snow became chairman, and Mahesh Jayanarayan became chief executive officer, replacing interim CEO Irene Kuan. On July 1, 2005, Eugene Levich was appointed chief technical officer of NME. Levich had a long history of developing multi-layer formats, such as the fluorescent multilayer disc of Constellation 3D.

In December 2005, NME announced an agreement with Chinese-based company E-World which was developing a similar format called Enhanced Versatile Disc. At CeBIT in March 2006, NME demonstrated a prototype VMD player and announced that it was expecting to launch the format in the third quarter of 2006. NME claimed 100 titles would be available in 2006.

At the Custom Electronic Design & Installation Association trade show in September 2007, NME exhibited two players set for release in October 2007. Twenty US titles were available at launch time, including some from Icon Productions, Paramount Pictures, Walt Disney Pictures, New Line Cinema, DreamWorks SKG, Lionsgate and The Weinstein Company. NME also signed a deal with Bollywood production company Eros Group who intended to release 50 Bollywood features on the format.

The two initial players to be released were the ML622S and the ML777S. The ML777S included USB ports for connection to external storage devices and a media card reader.

The manufacturers hoped to sell the format as a lower cost alternative to other optical technologies. However, the Great Recession of 2008 struck about this time, and NME struggled to stay in business.

On June 13, 2008 Geoffrey Russell, the interim chief executive officer of New Medium Enterprises, Inc., notified the US Securities and Exchange Commission that the company would be terminating the registration of the company, and that NMEN would cease filing reports with the SEC. The date of effect of this action was 90 days after 12 June 2008. In August 2008 in the UK, New Medium Electronics Limited, New Medium Entertainment Limited and New Medium Optics Limited notified Companies House of their applications for voluntary striking-off.

In October 2008, the technology behind HD-VMD was revived by companies Royal Digital Media, Anthem Digital and DreamStream to produce a new 100 GB optical disc. Anthem Digital's chairman Michael Jay Solomon was the former chairman of New Medium Enterprises. As of December 2010, Royal Digital Media, Anthem Digital and DreamStream web sites were no longer available.

== Technical specifications ==
=== Disc format ===
The format uses approximately 5 GB per layer, which was similar to standard DVDs. Standard VMDs can use 4 layers, for 20 GB of storage. The rarer 8 and 10 layered discs store 40 GB to 50 GB, respectively. One manufacturer listed up to 20 layers on a disc being possible in the future.

The Blu-ray Disc uses a blue-violet laser, rather than VMD's red laser, which means Blu-ray can store more information per layer. This format has so far only utilized 1 and 2-layered versions. In January 2007, Toshiba announced development on a triple layer HD DVD (TL51) that would have had a capacity of 51 GB. Hitachi announced a 4 and 6 layer version of Blu-ray as well, capable of 100 GB and 200 GB respectively. A standard 4-layer VMD stored 20 GB, which was comparable to a 1-layered HD DVD (15 GB) and 1-layer Blu-ray Disc (25 GB).

=== Content format ===
The HD VMD format is capable of high-definition video resolutions up to 1080p which is comparable with Blu-ray and HD DVD. Video is encoded in MPEG-2 and VC-1 formats at a maximum bitrate of 40 Megabits per second. This falls between the maximum bitrates of HD DVD (36 Mbit/s) and Blu-ray (48 Mbit/s). There was the possibility that VMD discs could be encoded with the H.264 format in the future.

The HD VMD format supports up to 7.1-channel Dolby Digital, Dolby Digital Plus, and DTS audio output, though it does not offer Dolby TrueHD or DTS-HD Master Audio surround sound codecs.

== See also ==
- Comparison of high definition optical disc formats
