= Optical disc =

Flat, usually circular disc that encodes binary data

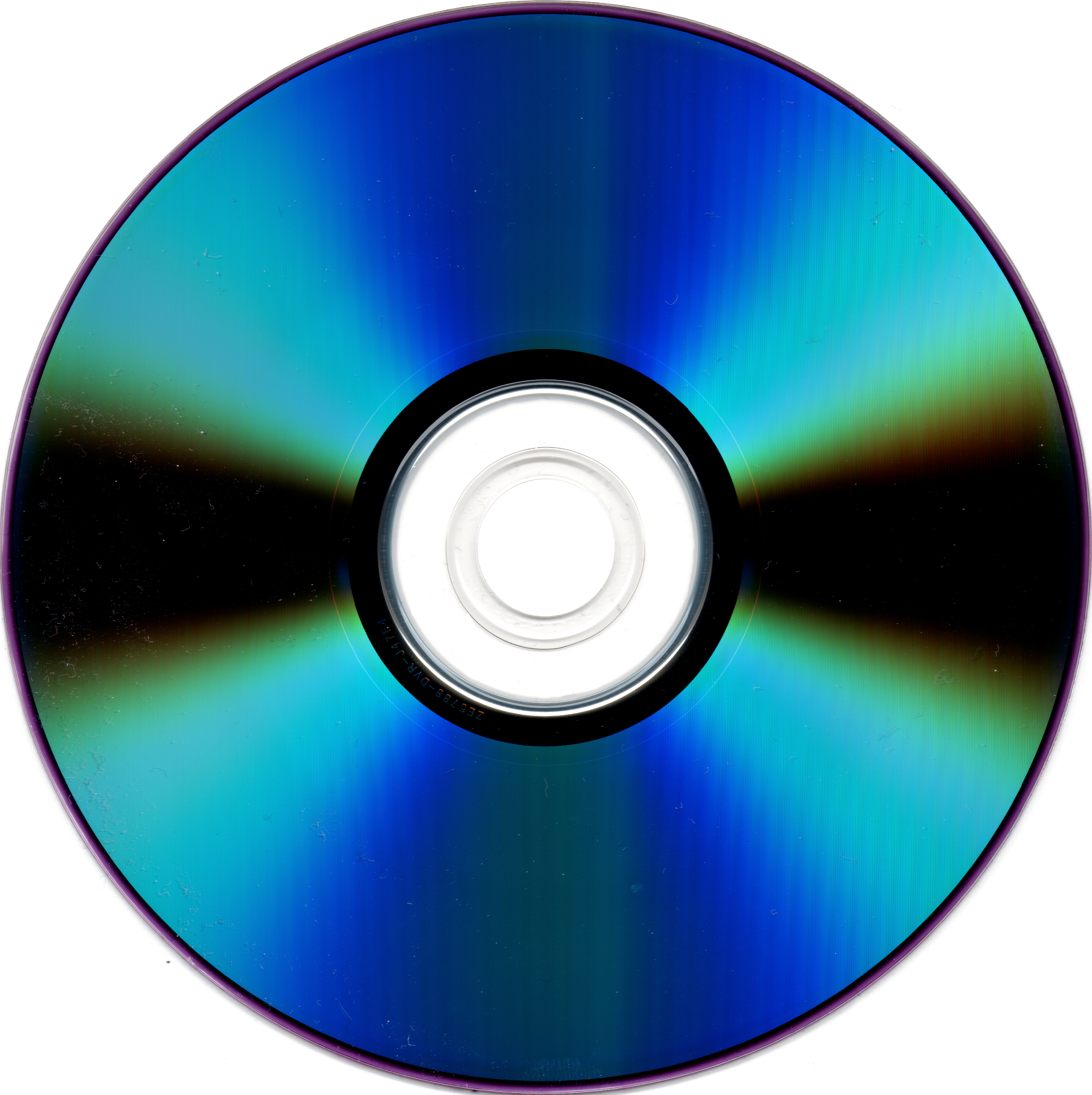
The bottom surface of a 12 cm compact disc (CD-R), showing characteristic iridescence

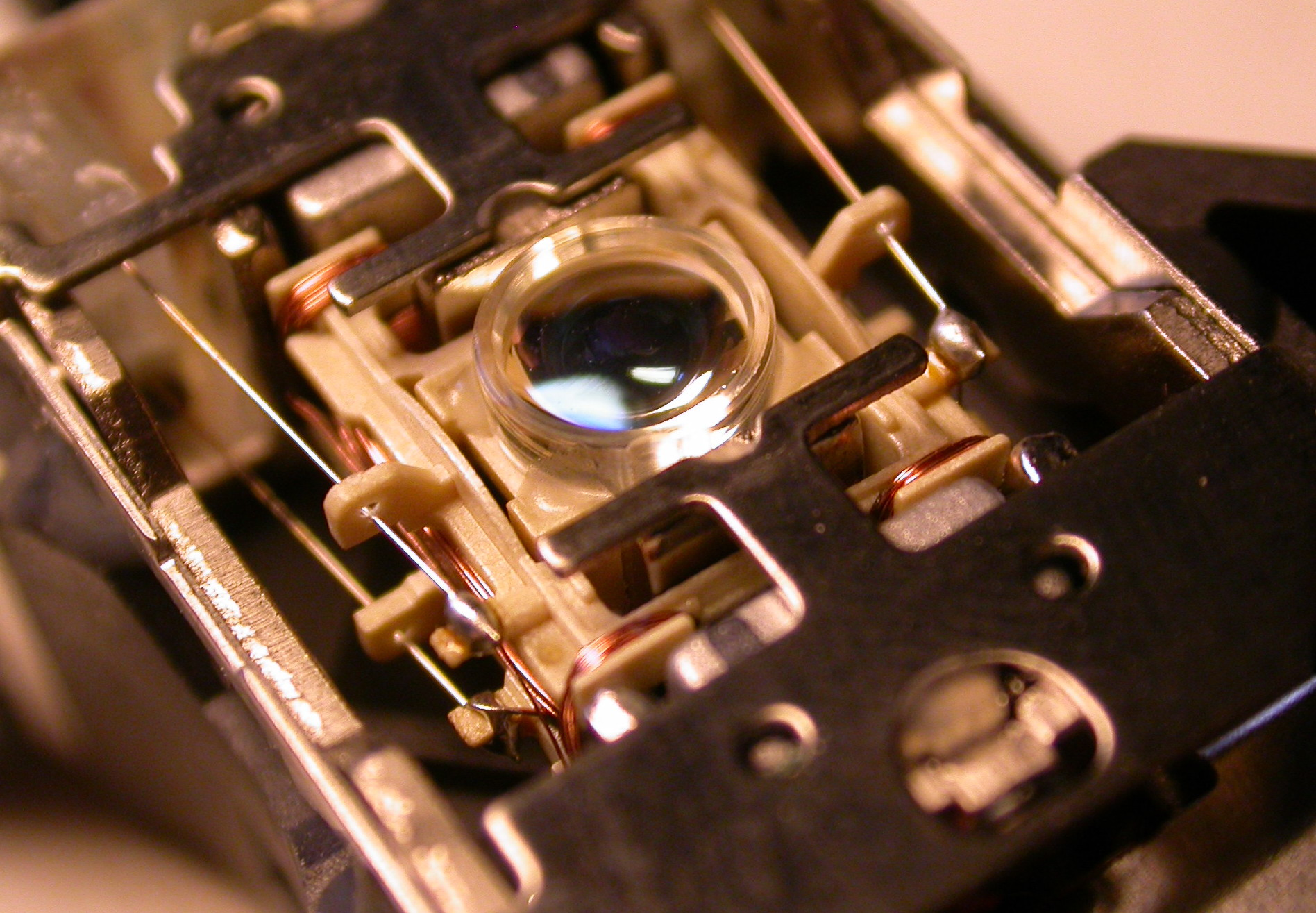
The optical lens of a compact disc drive

An optical disc is a flat, usually (Note: See shaped compact disc and bootable business card for instance, for exceptions.) disc-shaped object that stores information in the form of physical variations on its surface that can be read with a beam of light. Optical discs can be reflective, where the light source and detector are on the same side of the disc, or transmissive, where light shines through the disc to be detected on the other side. They may contain analog or digital information, or a mixture of the two. Their main uses are the distribution of electronic media and data, and archival storage.

== Design and technology ==
The encoding material sits atop a thicker substrate (usually polycarbonate) that makes up the bulk of the disc and forms a dust-defocusing layer. The encoding pattern follows a continuous, spiral path covering the entire disc surface and extending from the innermost track to the outermost track.

The data are stored on the disc with a laser or stamping machine, and can be accessed when the data path is illuminated with a laser diode in an optical disc drive that spins the disc at speeds of about 200 to 4,000 RPM or more, depending on the drive type, disc format, and the distance of the read head from the center of the disc (outer tracks are read at a higher data speed due to higher linear velocities at the same angular velocities).

Most optical discs exhibit a characteristic iridescence as a result of the diffraction grating formed by their grooves. This side of the disc contains the actual data and is typically coated with a transparent material, usually lacquer.

The reverse side of an optical disc usually has a printed label, sometimes made of paper but often printed or stamped onto the disc itself. Unlike the 3 1/2-inch floppy disk, most optical discs do not have an integrated protective casing and are therefore susceptible to data transfer problems due to scratches, fingerprints, and other environmental problems. Blu-rays have a coating called durabis that mitigates these problems.

Optical discs have been offered between 7.6 and 30 cm (3.0 and 11.8 in) in diameter, with 12 cm (4.7 in) becoming the dominant size beginning 1997. The so-called program area that contains the data commonly starts 25 millimeters away from the center point. A typical disc is about 1.2 mm (0.047 in) thick, while the track pitch (distance from the center of one track to the center of the next) ranges from 1.6 μm (for CDs) to 320 nm (for Blu-ray discs).

=== Recording types ===
An optical disc is designed to support one of three recording types: read-only (such as CD and CD-ROM), recordable (write-once, like CD-R), or re-recordable (rewritable, like CD-RW). Write-once optical discs commonly have an organic dye (may also be a (phthalocyanine) azo dye, mainly used by Verbatim, or an oxonol dye, used by Fujifilm) recording layer between the substrate and the reflective layer. Rewritable discs typically contain an alloy recording layer composed of a phase change material, most often AgInSbTe, an alloy of silver, indium, antimony, and tellurium. Azo dyes were introduced in 1996 and phthalocyanine only began to see wide use in 2002. The type of dye and the material used on the reflective layer on an optical disc may be determined by shining a light through the disc, as different dye and material combinations have different colors.

Blu-ray Disc recordable discs do not usually use an organic dye recording layer, instead using an inorganic recording layer. Those that do are known as low-to-high (LTH) discs and can be made in existing CD and DVD production lines, but are of lower quality than traditional Blu-ray recordable discs.

=== File systems ===
File systems specifically created for optical discs are ISO9660 and the Universal Disk Format (UDF).

ISO9660 can be extended using the Joliet extension to store longer file names than standalone ISO9660. The Rock Ridge extension can store even longer file names and Unix/Linux-style file permissions, but is not recognized by Windows and by DVD players and similar devices that can read data discs.

For cross-platform compatibility, multiple file systems can co-exist on one disc and reference the same files.

=== Usage ===
Optical discs are most commonly used for digital preservation, storing music (particularly for use in a CD player), video (such as for use in a Blu-ray player), or data and programs for personal computers (PC), as well as offline hard copy data distribution due to lower per-unit prices than other types of media. The Optical Storage Technology Association (OSTA) promoted standardized optical storage formats.

Libraries and archives enact optical media preservation procedures to ensure continued usability in the computer's optical disc drive or corresponding disc player.

File operations of traditional mass storage devices such as flash drives, memory cards and hard drives can be simulated using a UDF live file system.

For computer data backup and physical data transfer, optical discs such as CDs and DVDs are gradually being replaced with faster, smaller solid-state devices, especially the USB flash drive. This trend is expected to continue as USB flash drives continue to increase in capacity and drop in price.

Additionally, music, movies, games, software and TV shows purchased, shared or streamed over the Internet have significantly reduced the number of audio CDs, video DVDs and Blu-ray discs sold annually. However, audio CDs and Blu-rays are still preferred and bought by some, as a way of supporting their favorite works while getting something tangible in return and also since audio CDs (alongside vinyl records and cassette tapes) contain uncompressed audio without the artifacts introduced by lossy compression algorithms like MP3, and Blu-rays offer better image and sound quality than streaming media, without visible compression artifacts, due to higher bitrates and more available storage space. However, Blu-rays may sometimes be torrented over the internet, but torrenting may not be an option for some, due to restrictions put in place by Internet service providers on legal or copyright grounds, low download speeds or not having enough available storage space, since the content may weigh up to several dozen gigabytes. Blu-rays may be the only option for those looking to play large games without having to download them over an unreliable or slow internet connection, which is the reason why they are still (as of 2020) widely used by gaming consoles, like the PlayStation 4 and Xbox One X. As of 2020, it is unusual for PC games to be available in a physical format like Blu-ray.

Optical discs are typically stored in special cases, sometimes called jewel cases. Discs should not have any stickers and should not be stored together with paper; papers must be removed from the jewel case before storage. Discs should be handled by the edges to prevent scratching, with the thumb on the inner edge of the disc. The ISO Standard 18938:2014 is about best optical disc handling techniques. Optical disc cleaning should never be done in a circular pattern, to avoid concentric circles from forming on the disc. Improper cleaning can scratch the disc. Recordable discs should not be exposed to light for extended periods of time. Optical discs should be stored in dry and cool conditions to increase longevity, with temperatures between -10 and 23 °C, never exceeding 32 °C, and with humidity never falling below 10%, with recommended storage at 20 to 50% of humidity without fluctuations of more than ±10%.

=== Durability ===
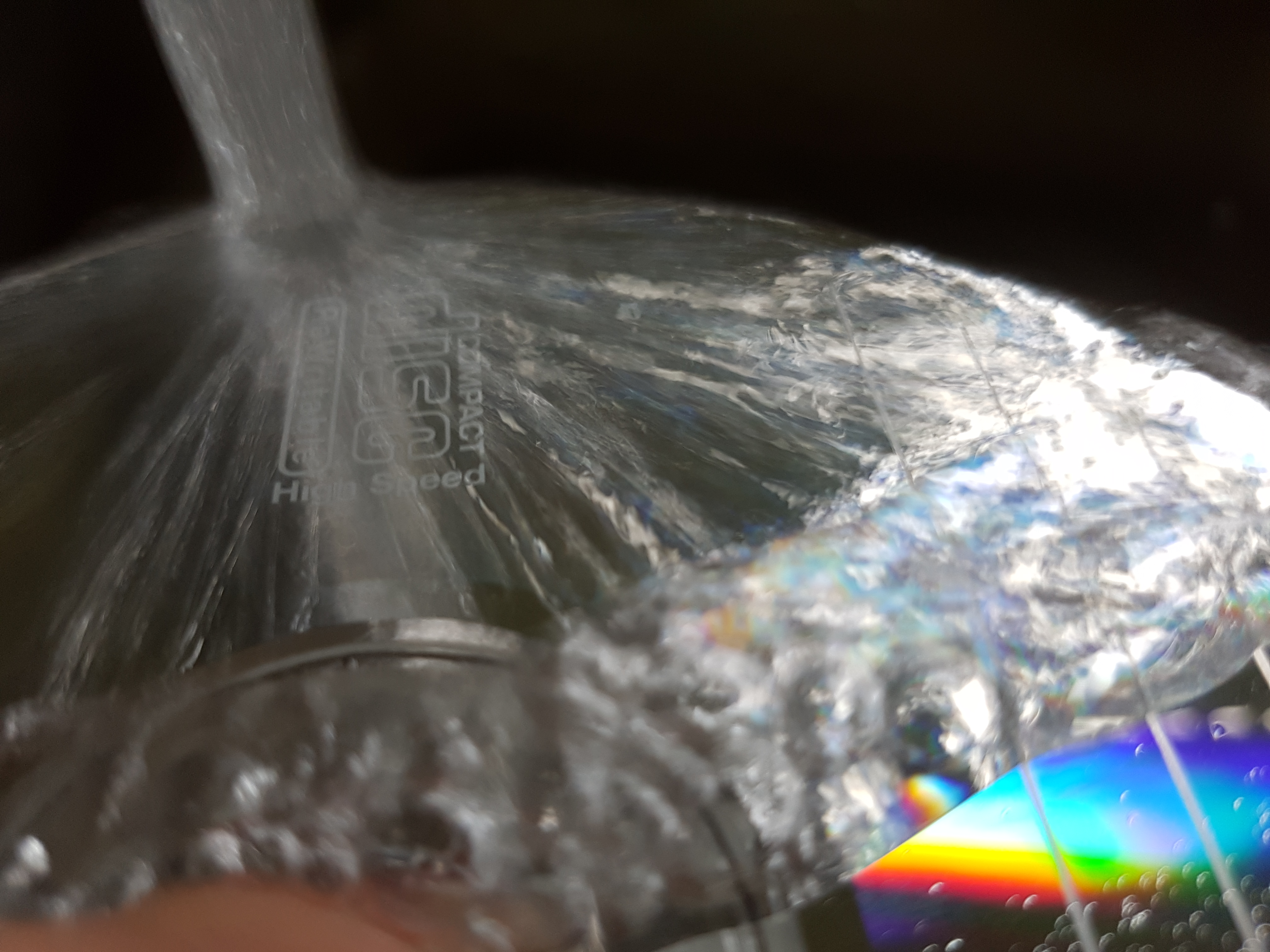
Optical discs are not vulnerable to water.

Although optical discs are more durable than earlier audio-visual and data storage formats, they are susceptible to environmental and daily-use damage if handled improperly.

Optical discs are not prone to uncontrollable catastrophic failures such as head crashes, power surges, or exposure to water like hard disk drives and flash storage, since optical drives' storage controllers are not tied to optical discs themselves like with hard disk drives and flash memory controllers, and a disc is usually recoverable from a defective optical drive by pushing an unsharp needle into the emergency ejection pinhole, and has no point of immediate water ingress and no integrated circuitry.

=== Security ===
As the media itself is accessed only through a laser beam and has no internal control circuitry, it cannot contain malicious hardware in the same way as so-called rubber-duckies or USB killers. Like any data storage media, optical discs can contain malicious data, and they are able to contain and spread malware - as happened in the case of the Sony BMG copy protection rootkit scandal in 2005, where Sony misused discs by pre-loading them with malware.

Many types of optical discs are factory-pressed or finalized write once read many storage devices and would therefore not be effective at spreading computer worms that are designed to spread by copying themselves onto optical media, because data on those discs can not be modified once pressed or written. However, re-writable disc technologies (such as CD-RW) are able to spread this type of malware.

== History ==
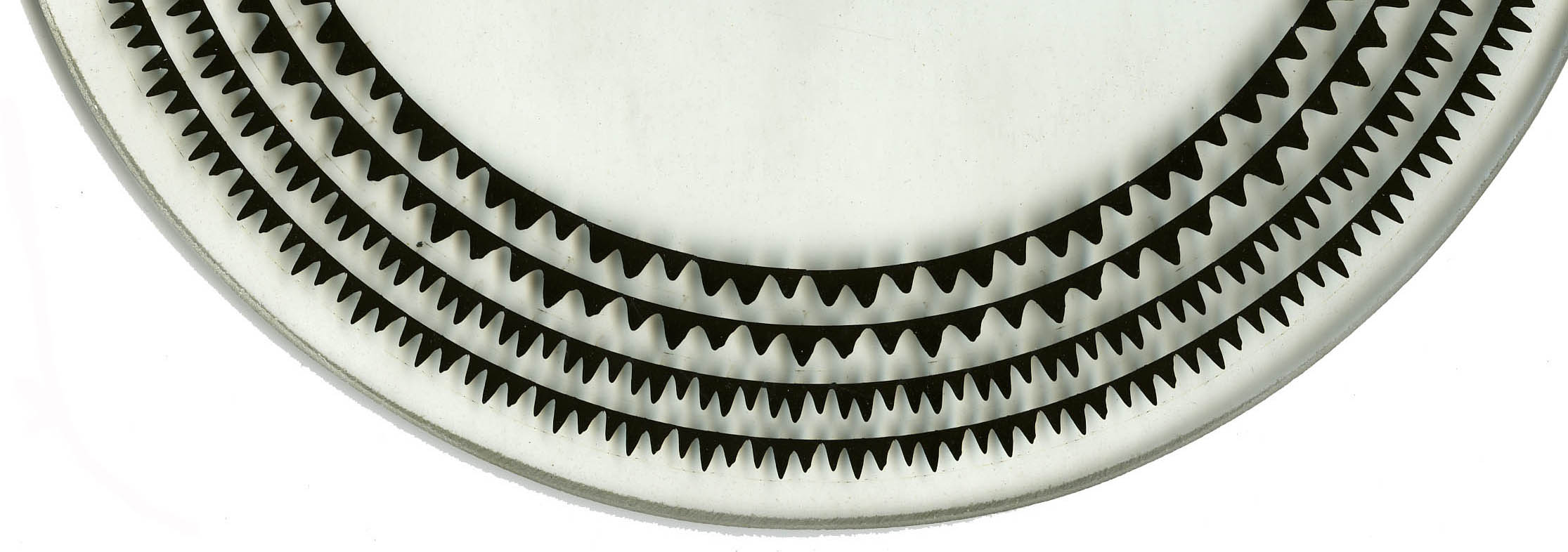
An earlier analog optical disc recorded in 1935 for Lichttonorgel (sampling organ)

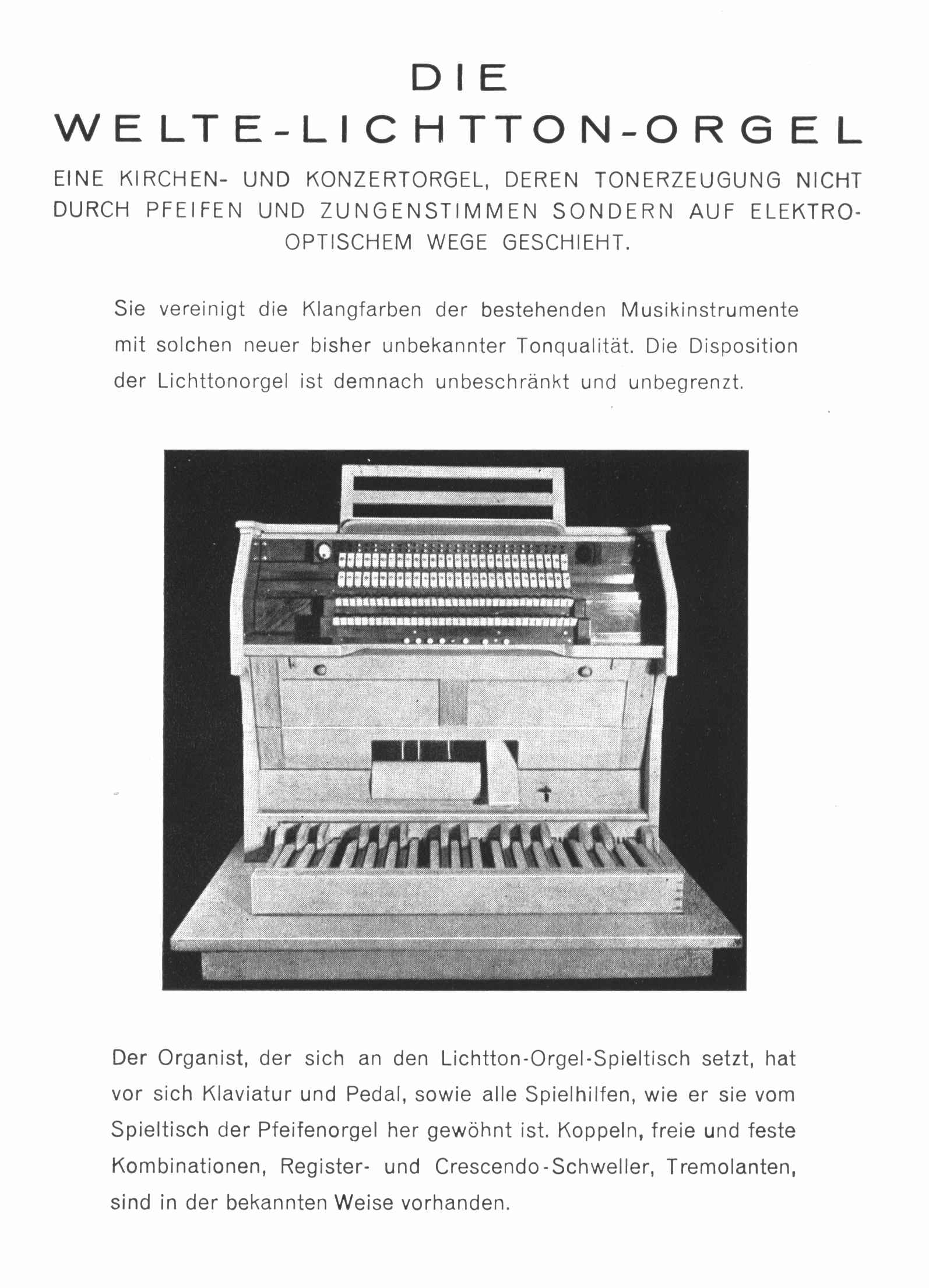
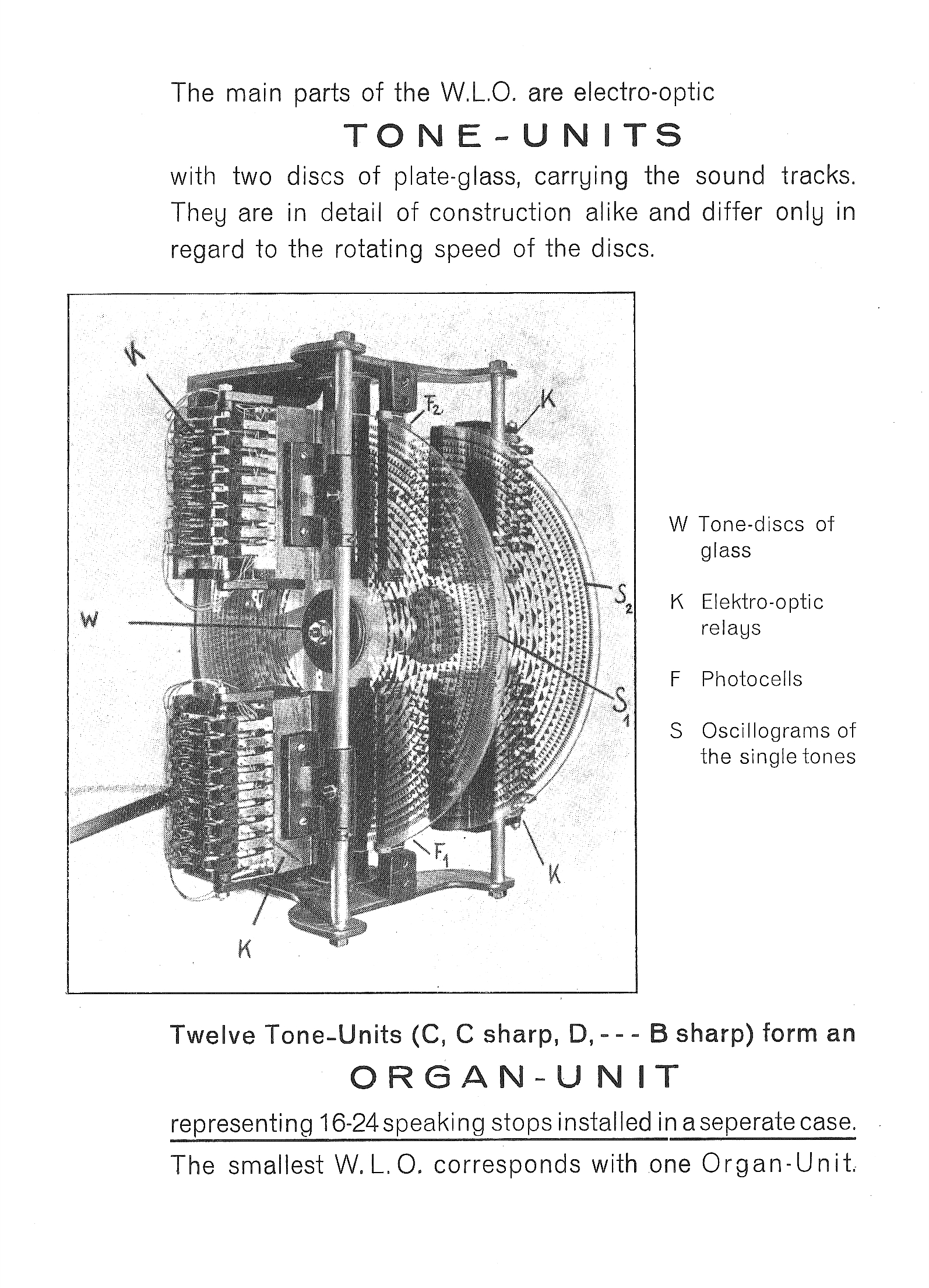
Lichttonorgel & optical disc system

The first recorded historical use of an optical disc was in 1884 when Alexander Graham Bell, Chichester Bell and Charles Sumner Tainter recorded sound on a glass disc using a beam of light.

Optophonie is a very early (1931) example of a recording device using light for both recording and playing back sound signals on a transparent photograph.

An early analogue optical disc system existed in 1935, used on Welte's Lichttonorgel sampling organ.

An early analog optical disc used for video recording was invented by David Paul Gregg in 1958 and patented in the US in 1961 and 1969. This form of optical disc was a very early form of the DVD (U.S. patent 3,430,966). It is of special interest that U.S. patent 4,893,297, filed in 1989 and issued in 1990, generated royalty income for Pioneer Corporation's DVA until 2007 —then encompassing the CD, DVD, and Blu-ray systems. In the early 1960s, the Music Corporation of America bought Gregg's patents and his company, Gauss Electrophysics.

American inventor James T. Russell has been credited with inventing the first system to record a digital signal on an optical transparent foil that is lit from behind by a high-power halogen lamp. Russell's patent application was first filed in 1966 and he was granted a patent in 1970. Following litigation, Sony and Philips licensed Russell's patents (then held by a Canadian company, Optical Recording Corp.) in the 1980s.

Both Gregg's and Russell's discs are floppy media read in transparent mode, which imposes serious drawbacks; after this were developed four generations of optical drive that includes Laserdisc (1969), WORM (1979), compact disc (1984), DVD (1995), Blu-ray (2005), HD DVD (2006).

=== First-generation ===
At the start, optical discs were read-only media used to store broadcast-quality analog video, and later digital media such as music or computer software. The LaserDisc format stored analog video signals for the distribution of home video, but commercially lost to the VHS videocassette format, due mainly to its high cost and non-re-recordability; other first-generation disc formats were designed only to store digital data and were not initially capable of use as a digital video medium.

Most first-generation disc devices had an infrared laser reading head. The minimum size of the laser spot is proportional to the wavelength of the laser, so wavelength is a limiting factor on the amount of information that can be stored in a given physical area on the disc. The infrared range is beyond the long-wavelength end of the visible light spectrum, so it supports less density than shorter-wavelength visible light. One example of high-density data storage capacity, achieved with an infrared laser, is 700 MB of net user data for a 12 cm compact disc.

Other factors that affect data storage density include: the existence of multiple layers of data on the disc, the method of rotation (Constant linear velocity (CLV), Constant angular velocity (CAV), or zoned-CAV), the composition of lands and pits, and how much margin is unused is at the center and the edge of the disc.

Sony and Philips developed the CD in the mid-1980s. 16-bit samples of the analog signal were taken at the rate of 44,100 samples per second. This sample rate was based on the Nyquist rate of 40,000 samples per second required to capture the audible frequency range to 20 kHz without aliasing, with an additional tolerance to allow the use of less-than-perfect analog anti-aliasing filters. The standard allows up to 74 minutes of music or 650 MB of data storage.

Types of Read-only Optical Discs:

- Compact disc (CD) and derivatives
  - Audio CD
  - Video CD (VCD)
  - Super Video CD
  - CD Video
  - CD-Interactive
- LaserDisc
- GD-ROM
- Double Density Compact Disc (DDCD)
- MiniDisc (MD)
  - MD Data
  - Hi-MD

==== Laserdisc ====
In the Netherlands in 1969, Philips Research physicist Pieter Kramer invented an optical videodisc in reflective mode with a protective layer read by a focused laser beam U.S. patent 5,068,846, filed 1972, issued 1991. Kramer's physical format is used in all optical discs.

In 1975, Philips and MCA began to work together, and in 1978, commercially much too late, they presented their long-awaited Laserdisc in Atlanta. MCA delivered the discs and Philips the players. However, the presentation was a commercial failure, and the cooperation ended.

In Japan and the U.S., Pioneer succeeded with the Laserdisc until the advent of the DVD. In 1979, Philips and Sony, in consortium, successfully developed the audio compact disc.

==== CD-ROM ====
The CD-ROM format was developed by Sony and Philips, introduced in 1984, as an extension of Compact Disc Digital Audio and adapted to hold any form of digital data. The same year, Sony demonstrated a LaserDisc data storage format, with a larger data capacity of 3.28 GB.

Types of recordable Optical Discs

- Magneto-optical disc
- Phase-change Dual
- Write Once Read Many (WORM)

==== Magneto-optical drive ====
Magneto-optical discs are erasable media, they can be written and read many times; the media and drives were first introduced in late 1987 and early 1988 by Sharp, MCI, Sony and others, all using SCSI interface. Capacity ranged from 512 MB on 130 mm media to 160 Mb on 90 mm media. By 1998 there were more than 50 models offered by 12 vendors with media of 86 and 130 mm in diameter and offering capacities up to 2,600 MB, almost all using SCSI interface.

==== WORM drive ====
In 1979, Exxon STAR Systems in Pasadena, CA built a computer-controlled WORM drive that utilized thin film coatings of Tellurium and Selenium on a 12" diameter glass disk. The recording system utilized blue light at 457 nm to record and red light at 632.8 nm to read. STAR Systems was bought by Storage Technology Corporation (STC) in 1981 and moved to Boulder, CO. Development of the WORM technology was continued using 14" diameter aluminum substrates. Beta testing of the disk drives, originally labeled the Laser Storage Drive 2000 (LSD-2000), was only moderately successful. Many of the disks were shipped to RCA Laboratories (now David Sarnoff Research Center) to be used in the Library of Congress archiving efforts. The STC disks utilized a sealed cartridge with an optical window for protection U.S. patent 4,542,495.

=== Second-generation ===
Second-generation optical discs were for storing great amounts of data, including broadcast-quality digital video. Such discs usually are read with a visible-light laser (usually red); the shorter wavelength and greater numerical aperture allow a narrower light beam, permitting smaller pits and lands in the disc. In the DVD format, this allows 4.7 GB storage on a standard 12 cm, single-sided, single-layer disc; alternatively, smaller media, such as the DataPlay format, can have capacity comparable to that of the larger, standard compact 12 cm disc.

- DVD and derivatives
  - DVD-Video
  - DVD-Audio
  - DualDisc
  - Digital Video Express (DIVX)
  - DVD-RAM
  - DVD±R
- Hi-Vision LD
- Nintendo GameCube Game Disc (miniDVD derivative)
- Wii Optical Disc (DVD derivative)
- Super Audio CD (SACD)
- Enhanced Versatile Disc
- DataPlay
- Universal Media Disc (UMD)
- Ultra Density Optical

==== DVD-ROM ====
In 1995, a consortium of manufacturers (Sony, Philips, Toshiba, Panasonic) developed the second generation of the optical disc, the DVD. The DVD disc appeared after the CD-ROM had become widespread in society.

=== Third-generation ===
Third-generation optical discs are used for distributing high-definition video and videogames and support greater data storage capacities, accomplished with short-wavelength visible-light lasers and greater numerical apertures. Blu-ray Disc and HD DVD use blue-violet lasers and focusing optics of greater aperture, for use with discs with smaller pits and lands, thereby greater data storage capacity per layer. In practice, the effective multimedia presentation capacity is improved with enhanced video data compression codecs such as H.264/MPEG-4 AVC and VC-1.

- Blu-ray and derivatives (up to 400 GB - experimental)
  - BD-R and BD-RE
  - High Fidelity Pure Audio
  - AVCHD and AVCREC
  - BDXL and Blu-ray 3D
  - Ultra HD Blu-ray (4K Blu-ray) and 8K Blu-ray
- Wii U Optical Disc (25 GB per layer)
- HD DVD (discontinued disc format, up to 51 GB triple layer)
- CBHD (a derivative of the HD DVD format)
- HD VMD
- Professional Disc

Announced but not released:

- Digital Multilayer Disk
- Fluorescent Multilayer Disc
- Forward Versatile Disc

==== Blu-ray and HD DVD ====
The third-generation optical disc was developed in 2000–2006 and was introduced as Blu-ray Disc. First movies on Blu-ray Discs were released in June 2006. Blu-ray eventually prevailed in a high definition optical disc format war over a competing format, the HD DVD. A standard Blu-ray disc can hold about 25 GB of data, a DVD about 4.7 GB, and a CD about 700 MB.

Comparison of various optical storage media

=== Fourth-generation ===
The following formats go beyond the current third-generation discs and have the potential to hold more than one terabyte (1 TB) of data and at least some are meant for cold data storage in data centers:

- Ultra HD Blu-ray
- Archival Disc
- Optical Disc Archive

Announced but abandoned:

- Holographic Versatile Disc

Announced but not released:

- LS-R
- Protein-coated disc
- Stacked Volumetric Optical Disc
- 5D DVD
- 3D optical data storage (not a single technology, examples are Hyper CD-ROM and Fluorescent Multilayer Disc)

In 2004, development of the Holographic Versatile Disc (HVD) commenced, which promised the storage of several terabytes of data per disc. However, development stagnated towards the late 2000s due to a lack of funding.

In 2006, it was reported that Japanese researchers developed ultraviolet ray lasers with a wavelength of 210 nanometers, which would enable a higher bit density than Blu-ray discs. As of 2022, no updates on that project have been reported.

=== Overview of optical types ===
Name	Capacity	Experimental (Note: Prototypes and theoretical values.)	Years (Note: Years from (known) start of development till end of sales or development.)
LaserDisc (LD)	N/A		1971–2007
Write Once Read Many Disk (WORM)	0.2–6.0 GB		1979–1984
Compact disc (CD)	0.7–0.9 GB		1982–present
Electron Trapping Optical Memory (ETOM)	6.0–12.0 GB		1987–1996
MiniDisc (MD)	0.14–1.0 GB		1989–2025
Magneto Optical Disc (MOD)	0.1–16.7 GB		1990–present
Digital Versatile Disc (DVD)	4.7–17 GB		1995–present
LIMDOW (Laser Intensity Modulation Direct OverWrite)	2.6 GB	10 GB	1996–present
GD-ROM	1.2 GB		1997–2006
Fluorescent Multilayer Disc		50–140 GB	1998-2003
Versatile Multilayer Disc (VMD)	5–20 GB	100 GB	1999-2010
Hyper CD-ROM	1 PB (supposedly; no working prototype)	100 EB (only theoretically)	1999–present
DataPlay	500 MB		1999-2006
Ultra Density Optical (UDO)	30–60 GB		2000–present
Forward Versatile Disc (FVD)	5.4–15 GB		2005–2006
Enhanced Versatile Disc (EVD)	DVD		2002-2004
HD DVD	15–51 GB	1 TB	2002-2008
Blu-ray Disc (BD)	25 GB; 50 GB		2002–present
BDXL	100 GB, 128 GB	1 TB	2010–present
Professional Disc for Data (PDD)	23 GB		2003-2006
Professional Disc	23–128 GB		2003–present
Digital Multilayer Disk		22-32 GB	2004–2007
Multiplexed Optical Data Storage (MODS-Disc)		250 GB–1 TB	2004–present
Universal Media Disc (UMD)	0.9–1.8 GB		2004–2014
Holographic Versatile Disc (HVD)		6.0 TB	2004–2012
Protein-coated disc (PCD)		50 TB	2005–2006
M-DISC	4.7 GB (DVD format); 25 GB (Blu-ray format); 50 GB (Blu-ray format); 100 GB (BDXL format)		2009–present
Archival Disc	0.3-1 TB		2014–2024
Optical Disc Archive	0.3-5.5 TB		2012–2024
Ultra HD Blu-ray	50 GB; 66 GB; 100 GB; 128 GB		2015–present

== Recordable and writable optical discs ==
There are numerous formats of optical direct to disk recording devices on the market, all of which are based on using a laser to change the reflectivity of the digital recording medium in order to duplicate the effects of the pits and lands created when a commercial optical disc is pressed. Formats such as CD-R and DVD-R are write once read many or write-once, while CD-RW and DVD-RW are rewritable, more like a magnetic recording hard disk drive (HDD).

Media technologies vary, for example, M-DISC media uses a rock-like layer to retain data for longer than conventional recordable media. While being read-only compatible with existing DVD and Blu-ray drives, M-DISC media can only be written to using a stronger laser specifically made for this purpose, which is built into fewer optical drive models.

== Surface error scanning ==
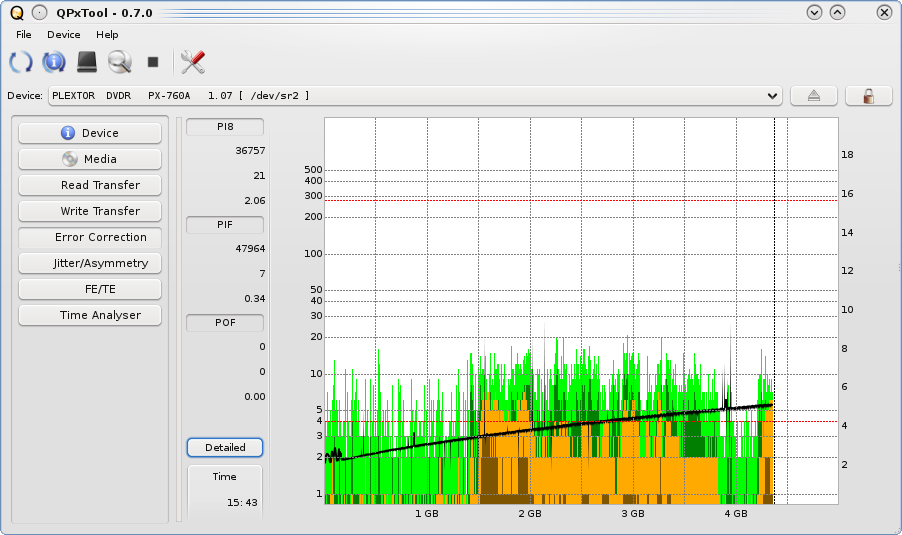
Error rate measurement on a DVD+R. The error rate is still within a healthy range.

Optical media can predictively be scanned for errors and media deterioration well before any data becomes unreadable. Optical formats include some redundancy for error correction, which works until the amount of error exceeds a threshold. A higher rate of errors may indicate deteriorating or low-quality media, physical damage, an unclean surface or media written using a defective optical drive.

Precise error scanning requires access to the raw, uncorrected readout of a disc, which is not always provided by a drive. As a result, support of this functionality varies per optical drive manufacturer and model. On ordinary drives without this functionality, it is possible to still look for unexpected reduction in read speed as an indirect, much less reliable measure.

Optical media, such as CDs and DVDs, can be scanned to detect errors and signs of deterioration well before data becomes unreadable. These formats include built-in error correction mechanisms, which function by adding redundant data. However, once the rate of errors surpasses the correction threshold, the media becomes vulnerable to failure. A high error rate can signal physical deterioration, low-quality manufacturing, surface contamination, or data recorded by a faulty optical drive.

Several specialized tools are available for performing error scans on optical media. Popular programs include Nero DiscSpeed, K-Probe, Opti Drive Control (previously known as CD Speed 2000), and DVD Info Pro for Windows. For cross-platform users, QPxTool is available to help monitor and maintain optical media integrity. Each of these tools allows for detailed analysis of the error rates and conditions affecting optical discs.

=== Error types ===
There are different types of error measurements, including so-called "C1", "C2" and "CU" errors on CDs, and "PI/PO (parity inner/outer) errors" and the more critical "PI/PO failures" on DVDs. Finer-grain error measurements on CDs supported by very few optical drives are called E11, E21, E31, E21, E22, E32.

"CU" and "POF" represent uncorrectable errors on data CDs and DVDs respectively, thus data loss, and can be a result of too many consecutive smaller errors.

Due to the weaker error correction used on Audio CDs (Red Book standard) and Video CDs (White Book standard), C2 errors already lead to data loss. However, even with C2 errors, the damage is inaudible to some extent.

Blu-ray discs use so-called LDC (Long Distance Codes) and BIS (Burst Indication Subcodes) error parameters. According to the developer of the Opti Drive Control software, a disc can be considered healthy at an LDC error rate below 13 and BIS error rate below 15.

== Optical disc manufacturing ==
Optical discs are made using replication. This process can be used with all disc types. Recordable discs have pre-recorded vital information, like manufacturer, disc type, maximum read and write speeds, etc. In replication, a cleanroom with yellow light is necessary to protect the light-sensitive photoresist and to prevent dust from corrupting the data on the disc.

A glass master is used in replication. The master is placed in a machine that cleans it as much as possible using a rotating brush and deionized water, preparing it for the next step. In the next step, a surface analyzer inspects the cleanliness of the master before photoresist is applied on the master.

The photoresist is then baked in an oven to solidify it. Then, in the exposure process, the master is placed in a turntable where a laser selectively exposes the resist to light. At the same time, a developer and deionized water are applied to the disc to remove the exposed resist. This process forms the pits and lands that represent the data on the disc.

A thin coating of metal is then applied to the master, making a negative of the master with the pits and lands in it. The negative is then peeled off the master and coated in a thin layer of plastic. The plastic protects the coating while a punching press punches a hole into the center of the disc and punches out excess material.

The negative is now a stamper - a part of the mold that will be used for replication. It is placed on one side of the mold with the data side containing the pits and lands facing out. This is done inside an injection molding machine. The machine then closes the mold and injects polycarbonate in the cavity formed by the walls of the mold, which forms the disc with the data on it.

The molten polycarbonate fills the pits or spaces between the lands on the negative, acquiring their shape when it solidifies. This step is somewhat similar to record pressing.

The polycarbonate disc cools quickly and is promptly removed from the machine before forming another disc. The disc is then metallized, covered with a thin reflective layer of aluminum. The aluminum fills the space once occupied by the negative.

A layer of varnish is then applied to protect the aluminum coating and provide a surface suitable for printing. The varnish is applied near the center of the disc, and the disc is spun, evenly distributing the varnish on the surface of the disc. The varnish is hardened using UV light. The discs are then silkscreened or a label is otherwise applied.

Recordable discs add a dye layer, and rewritable discs add a phase change alloy layer instead, which is protected by upper and lower dielectric (electrically insulating) layers. The layers may be sputtered. The additional layer is between the grooves and the reflective layer of the disc. Grooves are made in recordable discs in place of the traditional pits and lands found in replicated discs, and the two can be made in the same exposure process. In DVDs, the same processes as in CDs are carried out, but in a thinner disc. The thinner disc is then bonded to a second, equally thin but blank, disc using UV-curable Liquid optically clear adhesive, forming a DVD disc. This leaves the data in the middle of the disc, which is necessary for DVDs to achieve their storage capacity. In multi layer discs, semi reflective instead of reflective coatings are used for all layers except the last layer, which is the deepest one and uses a traditional reflective coating.

Dual layer DVDs are made slightly differently. After metallization (with a thinner metal layer to allow some light to pass through), base and pit transfer resins are applied and pre-cured in the center of the disc. Then the disc is pressed again using a different stamper, and the resins are completely cured using UV light before being separated from the stamper. Then the disc receives another, thicker metallization layer, and is then bonded to the blank disc using LOCA glue. DVD-R DL and DVD+R DL discs receive a dye layer after curing, but before metallization. CD-R, DVD-R, and DVD+R discs receive the dye layer after pressing but before metallization. CD-RW, DVD-RW and DVD+RW receive a metal alloy layer sandwiched between 2 dielectric layers. HD DVD is made in the same way as DVD. In recordable and rewritable media, most of the stamper is composed of grooves, not pits and lands. The grooves contain a wobble frequency that is used to locate the position of the reading or writing laser on the disc. DVDs use pre-pits instead, with a constant frequency wobble.

=== Blu-ray ===
HTL (high-to-low type) Blu-ray discs are made differently. First, a silicon wafer is used instead of a glass master. The wafer is processed in the same way a glass master would.

The wafer is then electroplated to form a 300-micron-thick nickel stamper, which is peeled off from the wafer. The stamper is mounted onto a mold inside a press or embosser.

The polycarbonate discs are molded in a similar fashion to DVD and CD discs. If the discs being produced are BD-Rs or BD-REs, the mold is fitted with a stamper that stamps a groove pattern onto the discs, in lieu of the pits and lands found on BD-ROM discs.

After cooling, a 35 nanometre-thick layer of silver alloy is applied to the disc using sputtering. Then the second layer is made by applying base and pit transfer resins to the disc, and are pre-cured in its center.

After application and pre-curing, the disc is pressed or embossed using a stamper and the resins are immediately cured using intense UV light before the disc is separated from the stamper. The stamper contains the data that will be transferred to the disc. This process is known as embossing and is the step that engraves the data onto the disc, replacing the pressing process used in the first layer, and it is also used for multi-layer DVD discs.

Then, a 30 nanometre-thick layer of silver alloy is sputtered onto the disc and the process is repeated as many times as required. Each repetition creates a new data layer.

BD-R and BD-RE discs receive (through sputtering) a metal (recording layer) alloy (that is sandwiched between two dielectric layers, also sputtered, in BD-RE), before receiving the 30 nanometre metallization (silver alloy, aluminum or gold) layer, which is sputtered. Alternatively, the silver alloy may be applied before the recording layer is applied. Silver alloys are usually used in Blu-rays, and aluminum is usually used on CDs and DVDs. Gold is used in some archival CDs and DVDs, since it is more chemically inert and resistant to corrosion than aluminum, which corrodes into aluminum oxide, which can be seen in disc rot as transparent patches or dots in the disc that prevent the disc from being read, since the laser light passes through the disc instead of being reflected back into the laser pickup assembly to be read. Normally, aluminum does not corrode since it has a thin oxide layer that forms on contact with oxygen. In this case, it can corrode due to its thinness.

Then, the 98 micron-thick cover layer is applied using UV-curable liquid optically clear adhesive, and a 2 micron-thick hard coat (such as Durabis) is also applied and cured using UV light. In the last step, a 10 nanometre-thick silicon nitride barrier layer is applied to the label side of the disc to protect against humidity. Blu-rays have their data very close to the read surface of the disc, which is necessary for Blu-rays to achieve their capacity.

Discs in large quantities can either be replicated or duplicated. In replication, the process explained above is used to make the discs, while in duplication, CD-R, DVD-R or BD-R discs are recorded and finalized to prevent further recording and allow for wider compatibility. (See Optical disc authoring). The equipment is also different: replication is carried out by fully automated purpose-built machinery whose cost is in the hundreds of thousands of US dollars in the used market, while duplication can be automated (using what's known as an autoloader) or be done by hand, and only requires a small tabletop duplicator.

== Specifications ==
Base (1×) and (current) maximum speeds by generation
Generation	Base	Max	
Generation	(Mbit/s)	(Mbit/s)	×
1st (CD)	1.17	65.6	56×
2nd (DVD)	10.57	253.6	24×
3rd (BD)	36	504	14×
4th (AD)	?	?	14×

Capacity and nomenclature
Designation		Sides	Layers (total)	Diameter	Capacity
Designation		Sides	Layers (total)	(cm)	(GB)
BD	SS SL	1	1	8	7.8
BD	SS DL	1	2	8	15.6
BD	SS SL	1	1	12	25
BD	SS DL	1	2	12	50
BD	SS TL	1	3	12	100
BD	SS QL	1	4	12	128
CD–ROM 74 min	SS SL	1	1	12	0.682
CD–ROM 80 min	SS SL	1	1	12	0.737
CD–ROM	SS SL	1	1	8	0.194
DDCD–ROM	SS SL	1	1	12	1.364
DDCD–ROM	SS SL	1	1	8	0.387
DVD–1	SS SL	1	1	8	1.46
DVD–2	SS DL	1	2	8	2.66
DVD–3	DS SL	2	2	8	2.92
DVD–4	DS DL	2	4	8	5.32
DVD–5	SS SL	1	1	12	4.70
DVD–9	SS DL	1	2	12	8.54
DVD–10	DS SL	2	2	12	9.40
DVD–14	DS DL/SL	2	3	12	13.24
DVD–18	DS DL	2	4	12	17.08
DVD–R 1.0	SS SL	1	1	12	3.95
DVD–R (2.0), +R, –RW, +RW	SS SL	1	1	12	4.7
DVD-R, +R, –RW, +RW	DS SL	2	2	12	9.40
DVD–RAM	SS SL	1	1	8	1.46
DVD–RAM	DS SL	2	2	8	2.65
DVD–RAM 1.0	SS SL	1	1	12	2.58
DVD–RAM 2.0	SS SL	1	1	12	4.70
DVD–RAM 1.0	DS SL	2	2	12	5.16
DVD–RAM 2.0	DS SL	2	2	12	9.40

== See also ==
- Disc Description Protocol
- List of optical disc manufacturers
- Universal Disk Format (UDF)
