= XDCAM =

Series of products for digital recording

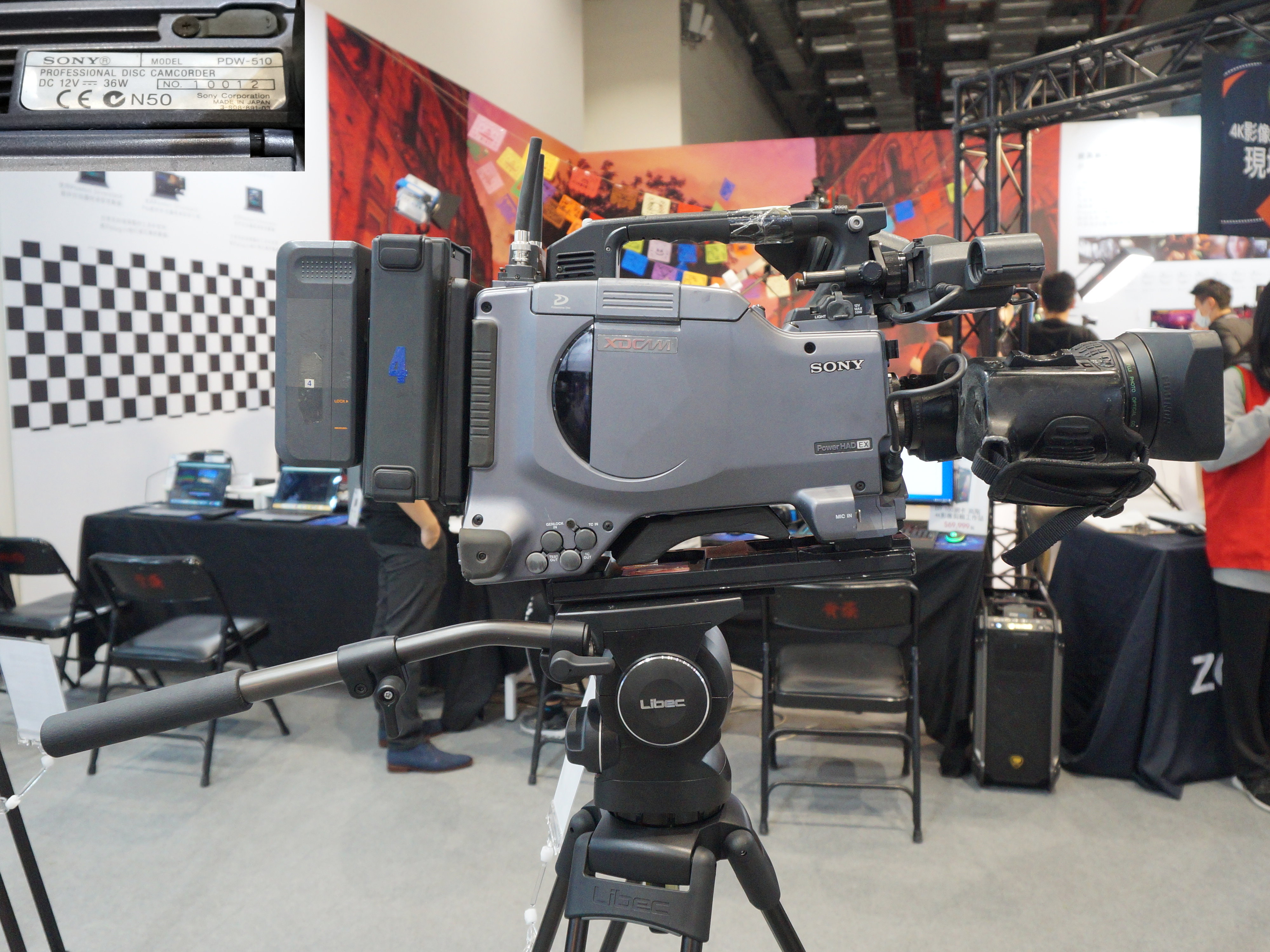
XDCAM Camcorder (DVCAM) PDW-510

XDCAM is a series of products for digital recording using random access solid-state memory media, introduced by Sony in 2003. Four different product lines – the XDCAM SD, XDCAM HD, XDCAM EX and XDCAM HD422 – differ in types of encoder used, frame size, container type and in recording media.

None of the later products have made earlier product lines obsolete. Sony maintains that different formats within XDCAM family have been designed to meet different applications and budget constraints.

The XDCAM range includes cameras and decks which act as drop-in replacements for traditional VTRs allowing XDCAM discs to be used within a traditional videotape-based workflow. These decks can also serve as random access computer hard drives for easy import of the video data files into non-linear editing systems (NLE) via FireWire (IEEE 1394) and Ethernet.

In September 2008, JVC announced its alliance with Sony to support the XDCAM EX format.

In August 2009, Convergent Design began shipping the nanoFlash Portable Recorder, which uses the Sony XDCAM HD422 codec.

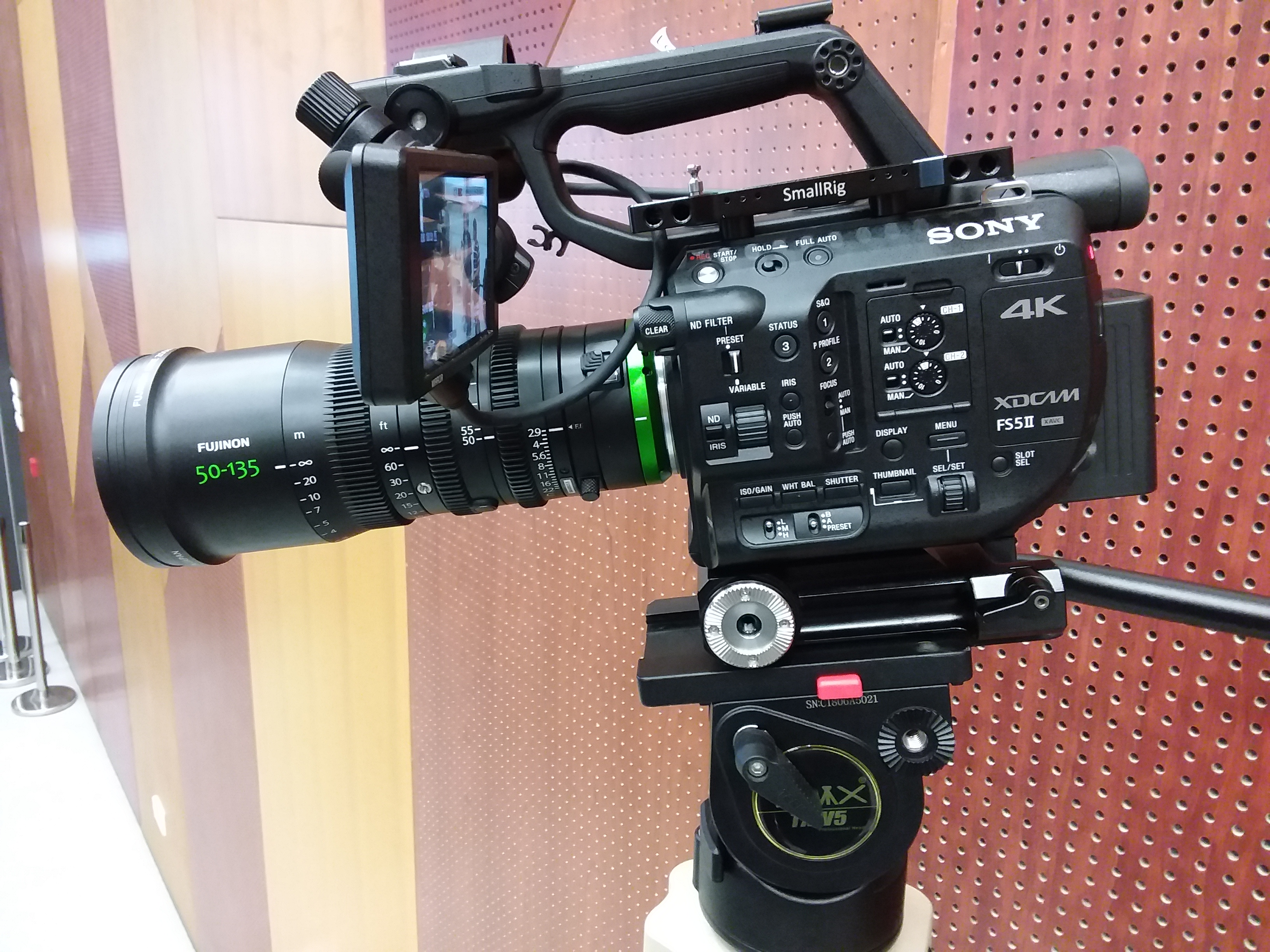
Sony XDCAM FS5 II handheld camcorder

In November 2012, VITEC began shipping the FS-T2001 Portable Recorder, which uses Sony XDCAM HD422 and XDCAM HD codec.

== Compression methods ==
The XDCAM format uses multiple video compression methods and media container formats.

Video is recorded with DV, MPEG-2 Part 2 or MPEG-4 compression schemes. DV is used for standard-definition video, MPEG-2 is used both for standard and high definition video, while MPEG-4 is used for proxy video.

Audio is recorded in uncompressed PCM form for all formats except proxy video, which uses A-law compression.

Equipment that uses Professional Disc as well as XDCAM 4:2:2 on SxS cards as recording media employs MXF container to store digital audio/digital video streams. Tapeless camcorders that record onto solid-state memory cards, use MP4 container for high definition audio/video, and DV-AVI container for DV video. JVC camcorders that use XDCAM EX recording format, are also capable of recording into QuickTime container besides using MP4 container.

== Recording formats ==
DVCAM uses standard DV encoding, which runs at 25 Mbit/s, and is compatible with most editing systems. Some camcorders that allow DVCAM recording can record progressive-scan video.

MPEG IMX allows recording in standard definition, using MPEG-2 encoding at data rate of 30, 40 or 50 megabits per second. Unlike most other MPEG-2 implementations, IMX uses intraframe compression with each frame having the same exact size in bytes to simplify recording onto video tape. Sony claims that at 50 Mbit/s it offers visual quality that is comparable to Digital Betacam MPEG IMX is not supported in the XDCAM EX product line.

MPEG HD is used in all product lines except for XDCAM SD. This format supports multiple frame sizes, frame rates, scanning types and quality modes. Depending on product line or a particular model, not all modes of this format may be available.

MPEG HD422 doubles the chroma horizontal resolution compared to the previous generations of high-definition video XDCAM formats. To accommodate the improved chroma detail, video bitrate has been increased to 50 Mbit/s. This format is used only in XDCAM HD422 products.

MPEG SHD422 XDCAM-SHD422 stands for "Super HD" and has been introduced later on to preserve more details. It maintains the 4:2:2 planar chroma sampling as well as the same resolution of MPEG HD422, but it increases the bitrate to 85 Mbit/s. This format has never become widely used and a very limited set of devices support it.

Proxy AV is used to record low resolution proxy videos. This format employs MPEG-4 video encoding at 1.5 Mbit/s (CIF resolution) with 64 kbit/s (8 kHz A-law, ISDN-quality) for each audio channel.

=== XDCAM formats ===
Format name	Container	Video coding	Bit depth	Color sampling	Frame size	Frame rate and scanning type	Video bit rate, Mbit/s	Audio coding
DVCAM	MXF, DV-AVI	DV	8	4:2:0	720x576	50i, 25p	25 (CBR)	PCM 4 ch/16 bit/48 kHz
DVCAM	MXF, DV-AVI	DV	8	4:1:1	720x480	59.94i, 29.97p	25 (CBR)	PCM 4 ch/16 bit/48 kHz
MPEG IMX	MXF	MPEG-2 422P@ML	8	4:2:2	720x576	50i Top First, 25p	30 (CBR), 40 (CBR), 50(CBR)	PCM 8 ch/16 bit/48 kHz, or 4 ch/24-bit/48 kHz
MPEG IMX	MXF	MPEG-2 422P@ML	8	4:2:2	720x480	59.94i Top First, 29.97p, 23.98p	30 (CBR), 40 (CBR), 50(CBR)	PCM 8 ch/16 bit/48 kHz, or 4 ch/24-bit/48 kHz
MPEG HD	MXF, MP4	MPEG-2 MP@H14/HL	8	4:2:0	1920x1080	59.94i Top First, 50i Top First, 29.97p, 25p, 23.98p	35 (VBR)	PCM 4 ch/16 bit/48 kHz
MPEG HD	MXF, MP4	MPEG-2 MP@H14/HL	8	4:2:0	1440x1080	59.94i Top First, 29.97p, 23.98p, 25p	18 (VBR), 25 (CBR), 35 (VBR)	PCM 4 ch/16 bit/48 kHz
MPEG HD	MXF, MP4	MPEG-2 MP@H14/HL	8	4:2:0	1280x720	59.94p, 29.97p, 23.98p, 50p, 25p	25 (CBR), 35 (VBR), 19 (CBR)^{[1]}	PCM 4 ch/16 bit/48 kHz
MPEG HD422	MXF	MPEG-2 422P@HL	8	4:2:2	1920x1080	59.94i Top First, 50i Top First, 29.97p, 25p, 23.98p	50 (CBR)	PCM 8 ch/24 bit/48 kHz, or 4 ch/24 bit/48 kHz
MPEG HD422	MXF	MPEG-2 422P@HL	8	4:2:2	1280x720	59.94p, 50p, 23.98p	50 (CBR)	PCM 8 ch/24 bit/48 kHz, or 4 ch/24 bit/48 kHz
MPEG SHD422	MXF	MPEG-2 422P@HL	8	4:2:2	1920x1080	59.94i Top First, 50i Top First, 29.97p, 25p, 23.98p	85 (CBR)	PCM 8 ch/24 bit/48 kHz, or 4 ch/24 bit/48 kHz
Proxy AV	MXF	MPEG-4 Part-2 (ASP)	8	4:2:0	CIF (50i - 352x288)	?	1.5	A-Law 4 ch/8 bit/8 kHz

1 720p @ 19 Mbit/s is offered by JVC and is equivalent to HDV 720p
XDCAM-SHD422 has a very limited support.

== Recording media ==
=== Professional Disc (XDCAM and XDCAM HD) ===
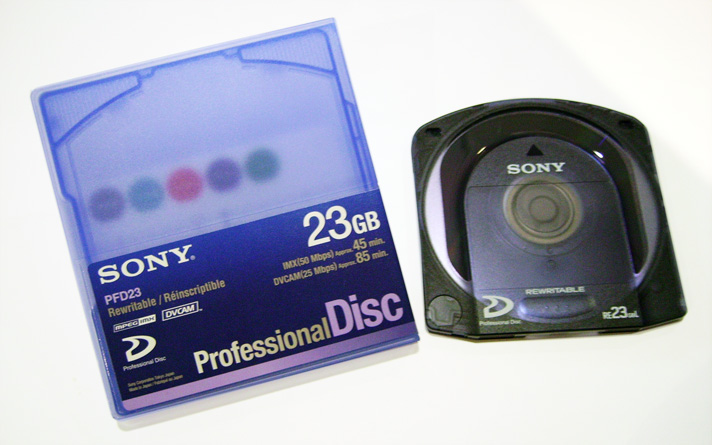
Professional Disc

The Professional Disc was chosen by Sony as its medium for professional non-linear video acquisition for a number of reasons, outlined in their white-paper Why Sony Adopted Professional Disc. This disc is similar to Blu-ray Disc and holds either 23 GB of data (PFD23, single-layer, rewritable), 50 GB (PFD50, dual-layer, rewritable), 100 GB (PFD100TLA, triple-layer, rewritable) or 128 GB (PFD128QLW, quad-layer, write-once).

Essentially, the Professional Disc format was deemed to be a suitable, cost effective and easy step forward. The discs are reliable and robust, suitable for field work (something which has previously been a problem with many disc-based systems). Additionally, the cost of media is comparable to existing professional formats.

=== SxS ===
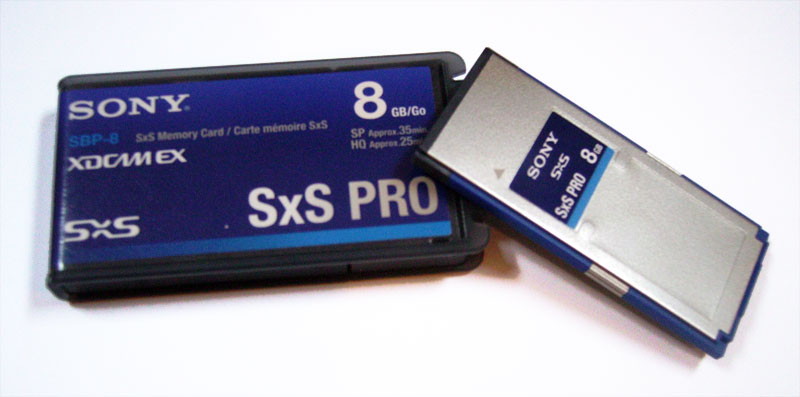
SxS memory card SBP-8

In 2008, Sony introduced a new recording medium to their XDCAM range – SxS Pro (pronounced "S-by-S"). It is a solid-state memory card implemented as an ExpressCard module. The first camera to use this media was the Sony PMW-EX1 professional video camera.

In December 2009, Sony introduced the more affordable SxS-1. This unit is designed to have the same performance as the SxS Pro card however its life expectancy is shorter at an estimated 5 years of life when used every day to the card's full capacity.

In early 2013, Sony has introduced SxS Pro+ cards. These have a 1.2 Gbit/s read and write speed to support the PMW-F55 in storing 4K 60p acquisition.

=== Memory Stick ===
Memory Stick cards can be used in Sony XDCAM EX camcorders via the MEAD-MS01 adapter.

=== Secure Digital ===
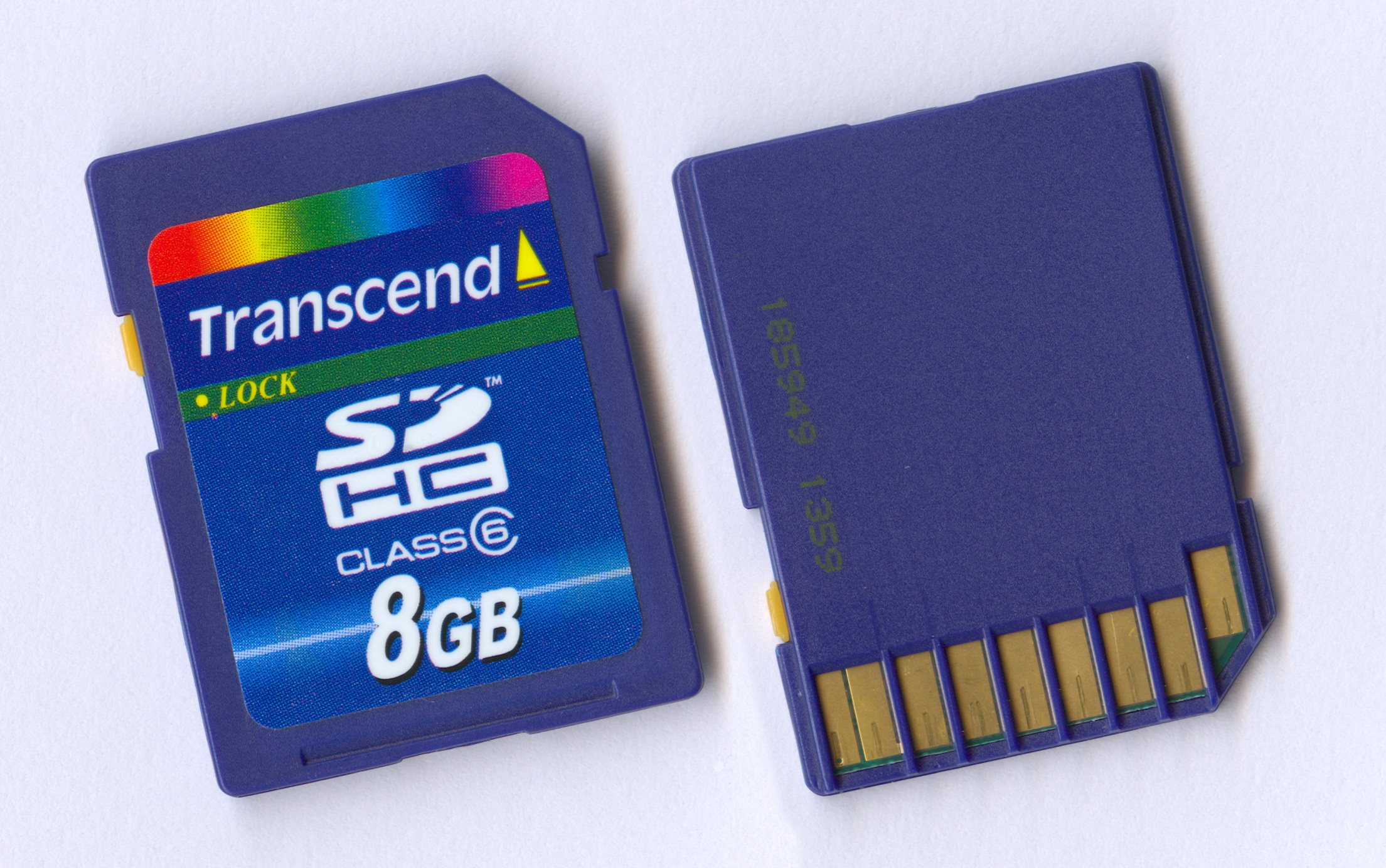
SDHC memory cards

Secure Digital memory cards can be used in Sony XDCAM EX camcorders via the MEAD-SD01 adapter. JVC camcorders that record in XDCAM EX format use Secure Digital memory cards natively.

=== XQD ===
XQD memory cards can be used in Sony XDCAM EX camcorders via the QDA-EX1 ExpressCard adapter.

== See also ==
- HDCAM
- XAVC
- Professional video camera
- Tapeless camcorder
