= Holographic Versatile Card =

Holographic Versatile Card

The Holographic Versatile Card (HVC) was a proposed data storage format by Optware; the projected date for a Japanese launch had been the first half of 2007, pending finalization of the specification, however as of January 2025, nothing has yet surfaced.This issue may be related to the bankrupt of certain entities once responsible for the development and investigation for both HVD & HVC back in 2010(see HVD page). One of its main advantages compared with Holographic_Versatile_Disc and other sorts of disks was supposed to be the lack of moving parts when played. They claimed it would hold about 30~150GB of data, with a write speed 3 times faster than Blu-ray, and be approximately the size of a credit card. Optware once claimed that at release the media would cost about ¥100 (roughly $1.20 at that time) each, that reader devices would initially cost about ¥200,000(roughly $2400) while reader/writer devices would have cost ¥1 000,000 (roughly $12000, as per exchange rate of Apr 2011) each.

== See also ==
- DVD
- HD DVD
- Holographic memory
- Holographic Versatile Disc
- Vaporware
