= Archival Disc =

Optical disc designed by Sony and Panasonic meant for data archiving

- Media type: Optical disc
- Encoding: Same as Blu-ray for data, different disc metadata format
- Capacity: 300 GB, 500 GB, 1 TB
- Block size: 2048 bytes
- Read mechanism: 155-405 nm diode laser, Numerical Aperture NA=0.85
- Write mechanism: 405 nm diode laser
- Standard: Archival Disc whitepaper v1
- Developed by: Sony; Panasonic
- Dimensions: 120 mm (4.7 in) diameter 1.2 mm thickness
- Weight: 16 grams (0.56 oz)
- Usage: Long-term data storage
- Extended from: Blu-ray Disc
- Released: 2015 (11 years ago)
- Discontinued: 2024 (2 years ago)

Archival Disc (AD) is the trademarked name of a discontinued optical disc storage medium designed by Sony and Panasonic for long-term digital storage. First announced on 10 March 2014 and introduced in the second quarter of 2015, the discs were intended to withstand changes in temperature and humidity, in addition to dust and water, ensuring that the disc would be readable for at least 50 years. The agreement between Sony and Panasonic to jointly develop the next generation optical media standard was first announced on 29 July 2013. The discs were mass-produced by Panasonic in 2016. The product was discontinued as of 2024. The two companies have since collaborated on the development of another format, Optical Disc Archive.

== Specifications ==
Originally, the discs were designed to hold 300 gigabytes of data, then a second version of the discs could hold up to 500 gigabytes, and eventually a third version of the discs could store up to one terabyte of data, based on the roadmap plans of both companies.

The Archival Disc standard jointly developed by Sony and Panasonic used signal processing technologies such as narrow track pitch crosstalk cancellation, high linear density inter-symbol interference cancellation and multi-level recording. The disc structure features dual sides, with three layers on each side, and a land and groove format. The track pitch is 0.225 μm, the data bit length is 79.5 nm, and the standard will utilise the method of Reed–Solomon Code error correction.

In 2019, Sony and Panasonic released a third-generation Optical Disc Archive. In 2020, Sony began shipping their Gen3 PetaSite Optical Disc Archive, which could store up to 2.9 PB of data.

== Use ==
Sony expected the new standard to see usage in the film industry (such as storage of 4K resolution audiovisual data), archival services, and cloud data centres handling big data. By 2014, the disc format was not intended as a consumer storage medium, but rather for professional-level data archives. In order to reach a larger capacity whilst ensuring higher playback signal quality, the standard was planned to employ cross talk cancellation and partial-response maximum-likelihood (PRML) signal processing. Both companies marketed the optical format under their respective brands.

Sony used Archival Disc in their Optical Disc Archive professional archival product range, and aimed to create at least a 6-TB storage medium. By 2020, they were offering 5.5 TB Optical Disc Archive Cartridges. It was also used in Sony's everspan product, which could hold up to 180 PB of data.

In 2016, a use case for Archival Disc was projected for cold data storage within the data center.

== See also ==
- M-DISC
- Optical Disc Archive
