= Nearline storage =

Type of data storage

Nearline storage (a portmanteau of "near" and "online storage") is a term used in computer science to describe an intermediate type of data storage that represents a compromise between online storage (supporting frequent, very rapid access to data) and offline storage/archiving (used for backups or long-term storage, with infrequent access to data).

Nearline storage dates back to the IBM 3850 Mass Storage System (MSS) tape library, which was announced in 1974.

== Overview ==
The formal distinction between online, nearline, and offline storage is:

- Online storage is immediately available for input/output (I/O).
- Nearline storage is not immediately available, but can be made online quickly without human intervention.
- Offline storage is not immediately available, and requires some human intervention to become online.

For example, always-on spinning hard disk drives are online storage, while spinning drives that spin down automatically, such as in Massive Arrays of Idle Disks (MAID), are nearline storage. Removable media such as tape cartridges that can be automatically loaded, as in tape libraries, are nearline storage, while tape cartridges that must be manually loaded are offline storage.

== Robotic nearline storage ==
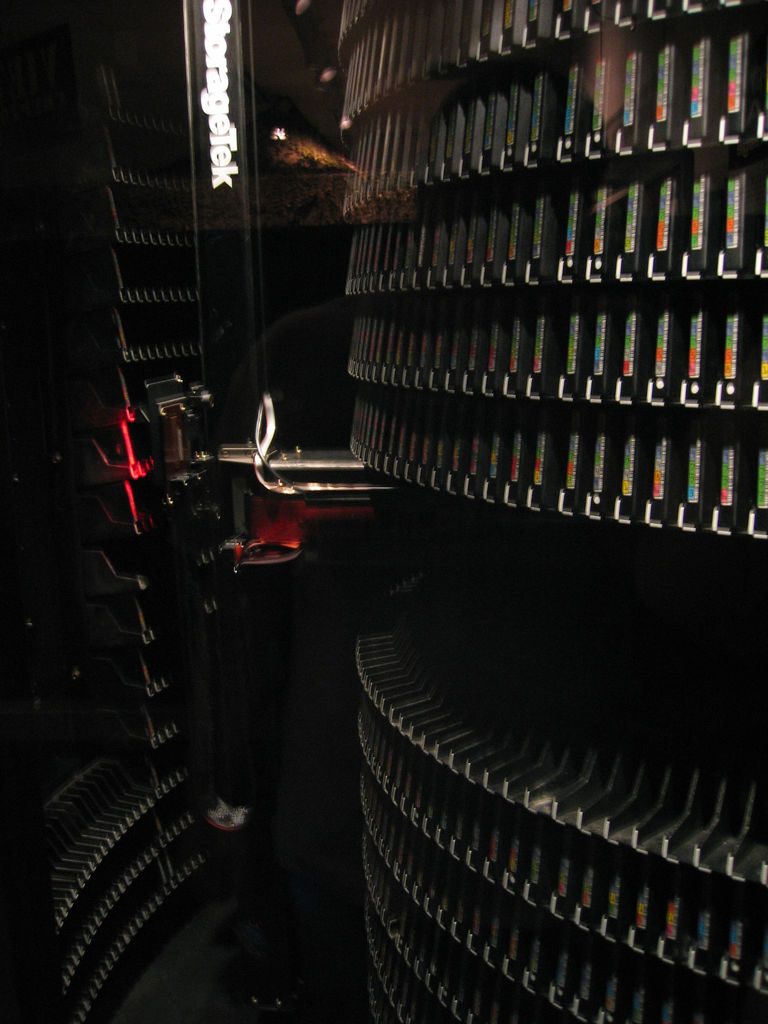
A large tape library, with tape cartridges placed on shelves in the front, and a robotic arm moving in the back. Visible height of the library is about 180 cm.

The nearline storage system knows on which volume (cartridge) the data resides, and usually asks a robot to retrieve it from this physical location (usually: a tape library or optical jukebox) and put it into a tape drive or optical disc drive to enable access by bringing the data it contains online. This process is not instant, but it only requires a few seconds.

Nearline tape and optical storage has the advantage of relatively longer lifespans compared to spinning hard drives, simply due to the storage media being idle and usually stored in protected dust-free enclosures when not in use. In a robotic tape loading system, the tape drive used for accessing data experiences the most wear and may need occasional replacement, but the tapes themselves can last for years to decades. If there are sealable access doors between the access mechanism and the media, it is possible for the idle media storage enclosure to survive fire, floods, lightning strikes, and other disasters.

== Hard disk drive nearline storage ==
MAID (massive array of idle drives) systems archive data in an array of hard disk drives, with most drives in a MAID usually stopped. The MAID system spins up each drive on demand when necessary to read (or in some cases to write) data on that drive. For a given amount of storage capacity, MAID systems have higher densities and lower power and cooling requirements than "hot" storage systems that keep all the disks spinning at full speed at all times.

Some hard drive and storage systems vendors and suppliers use the term in reference to low-rotational speed hard drives that are built to be more reliable than generic desktop and laptop computer hard drives. They are intended to be operational continuously for 24 hours a day, seven days a week, possibly for several years.

Nearline hard drives may be used in personal or small business network-attached storage (NAS) systems, or as non-critical moderate-performance data storage on servers, where greater durability is required for the drive to operate continuously.

By comparison, standard hard drives are assumed to only be in operation for a few hours each day, and are not spinning when the computer is either turned off or in sleep mode. Standard hard drives may also use data caching methods that can improve single-drive performance, but would interfere with the operation of multi-drive RAID storage systems, potentially causing data loss or corruption.

Specifically the term nearline hard drive is being used to refer to high-capacity Serial ATA drives that work with Serial Attached SCSI storage devices.
