= Stacked Volumetric Optical Disc =

Novel optical storage medium

The Stacked Volumetric Optical Disc (or SVOD) is an optical disc format developed by Hitachi Maxell which uses an array of wafer-thin optical discs to allow data storage.

Each "layer" (a thin polycarbonate disc) holds around 9.4 GB of information, and the wafers are stacked in layers of 20, 25, 100, or more, giving a substantially larger overall data capacity than other optical storage formats; for example, 100× cartridges could hold 940 GB using the system as announced.

Hitachi Maxell announced the creation of the SVOD standard in 2006, intending to launch it the next year. Aimed primarily at commercial users, the target price was ¥40,000 for a cartridge of 100 thin discs, with the potential to expand into the home user market. When they announced the system, Hitachi Maxell publicly recognized the possibility that the system could be eventually modified for use with a blue-violet laser, similar to Blu-ray discs, which could have expanded the capacity of the system to 3-5 TB. It is possible that they in fact developed this "second generation" SVOD for use with standard Blu-ray lasers, with each thin disc having a storage capacity of 25 GB, or a 100-disc cartridge having a storage of 5 TB. Hitachi Maxell developed systems both for burning to the media using standard DVD optical heads, and pre-recording to the media using a special heat imprint technique they called "nanoimprinting." Though nanoimprinting initially required 6 minutes per disc for pressing, they had improved it to 8 seconds, and intended to achieve a comparable throughput to standard DVD pressing. The primary application of the SVOD system seemed to be business data archival, replacing digital tape archives.

In 2007, Japanese broadcaster NHK announced a similar system, based on Blu-ray discs, of stacked optical storage media specifically designed to rotate at high speeds, up to 15,000 RPM.

SVOD was anticipated to be a likely candidate, along with Holographic Versatile Discs (HVDs), to be a next-generation optical disc standard. However, as of 2021, little has been done with the format.
