= Satoshi Kawata =

Japanese scientist

Satoshi Kawata (河田 聡, Kawata Satoshi; born 1 October 1951), is a scientist based in Japan who is active in nanotechnology, photonics, plasmonics, and other areas of applied physics. He is a Professor of Department of Applied Physics at Osaka University. He is also a Chief Scientist at RIKEN. Kawata was the 2022 president of Optica.

== Biography ==
=== Career ===
Kawata studied under Tatsuro Suzuki and received his bachelor's degree in 1974, his master's degree in 1976 and his doctorate from Osaka University in 1979.

After his experience as a Japan Society for the Promotion of Science post-doctoral fellow at Osaka University and as a Research associate at the University of California, Irvine, he joined the Department of Applied Physics at Osaka University as a faculty member and studied under Shigeo Minami. In 1993, he was promoted to full professor, and served as the Director of Frontier Research Center, from 2001 to 2003, and is currently the Director of the Photonics Advanced Research Center. Since 2002, Kawata is jointly at RIKEN as a Chief Scientist of the Nanophotonics Laboratory. Kawata is known for his work in nanophotonics (study of the interaction between photons and nanostructures). He has contributed to the community via a number of inventions, publications, and conference organizations in fields including near-infrared spectroscopy, laser-scanning microscopy, near-field optics, plasmonics, biophotonics, laser nanofabrication and signal recovery.

Kawata has served as the President of the Spectroscopical Society of Japan from 2004 to 2007, President of the Japan Society of Applied Physics (JSAP) from 2014-2015, an Editor for Optics Communications from 2000 till present, a Program Officer of the Japan Society for the Promotion of Science and a joint professor at the Department of Physics at Gakushuin University. He is a fellow of Optica, Institute of Physics (IOP), the International Society for Optical Engineering (SPIE) and the Japan Society of Applied Physics.

=== Awards ===
Kawata received one of the Medals of Honour (Japan) with purple ribbon, which is awarded by the Emperor of Japan in 2007, the Minister's Award for Science and Technology by the Ministry of Education, Culture, Sports, Science and Technology Japan in 2005.

In 2024, he was designated a Person of Cultural Merit.
