= Photon-induced electric field poling =

In physics, photon-induced electric field poling is a phenomenon whereby a pattern of local electric field orientations can be encoded in a suitable ferroelectric material, such as perovskite. The resulting encoded material is conceptually similar to the pattern of magnetic field orientations within the magnetic domains of a ferromagnet, and thus may be considered a possible technology for computer storage media. The encoded regions are optically active (have a varying index of refraction) and thus may be "read out" optically.

== Encoding process ==
The encoding process proceeds by application of ultraviolet light tuned to the absorption band associated with the transition of electrons from the valence band to the conduction band. During UV application, an external electric field is used to modify the electric dipole moment of regions of the ferroelectric material that are exposed to UV light. By this process, a pattern of local electric field orientations can be encoded.

Technically, the encoding effect proceeds by the creation of a population inversion between the valence and conduction bands, with the resulting creation of plasmons. During this time, ferroelectric perovskite materials can be forced to change geometry by the application of an electric field. The encoded regions become optically active due to the Pockels effect.

== Decoding process ==
The pattern of ferroelectric domain orientations can be read out optically. The refractive index of the ferroelectric material at wavelengths from near-infrared through to near-ultraviolet is affected by the electric field within the material. A changing pattern of electric field domains within a ferroelectric substrate results in different regions of the substrate having different refractive indices. Under these conditions, the substrate behaves as a diffraction grating, allowing the pattern of domains to be inferred from the interference pattern present in the transmitted readout beam.

== See also ==
- Electro-optic effect
- Birefringence
- Holographic memory
- Magneto-optic effect
