= Ultra Density Optical =

Optical disc designed for the storage of digital video

Ultra Density Optical (UDO) is an optical disc format designed for high-density storage of high-definition video and data. The format was introduced by Sony to replace the Magneto-optical disc format.

== Overview ==
An Ultra Density Optical disc, or UDO, is a 133.35 mm (5.25") ISO cartridge optical disc which can store up to 30 GB (gigabytes) of data. The second generation UDO2 media format was introduced in April 2007 and has a capacity of up to 80 GB. It utilizes a design based on the Magneto-optical disc, but uses Phase Change technology combined with a blue violet laser. A UDO/UDO2 disc that can store substantially more data than a magneto-optical (MO) disc. This is due to the shorter wavelength (405 nm) of the blue-violet laser employed. MOs use a 650 nm-wavelength red laser. Because its beam width is shorter when burning to a disc than a red-laser for MO, a blue-violet laser allows more information to be stored digitally in the same amount of space.

Current generations of UDO2 media store up to 60 GB.

=== History ===
UDO optical disc storage media was developed as a replacement for the 9.1 GB Magneto-optical digital storage medium. The Ultra Density Optical was first announced by Sony on November 1, 2000. It was later adopted with heavy investment by Plasmon, a UK technology company with extensive experience with computer archival backup systems and solutions.

Currently, UDO/UDO2 is being championed by its development partners Plasmon, Asahi Pentax (responsible for the opto-mechanical assembly design), Mitsubishi Chemical, parent company of the Verbatim media storage brand, and various computer and IT solutions companies. Mitsubishi Chemical is the second major development partner of UDO media and the sole manufacturer of UDO media as of the 4th quarter of 2008.

On November 10, 2008, Plasmon creditors (led by Silicon Valley Bank) closed down Plasmon LMS (company) as CEO Stephen 'FX' Murphy was unable to secure funding to keep the money-losing company afloat. The UDO media factory in the UK was shut down and dismantled.

On January 13, 2009, Alliance Storage Technologies, a Colorado Springs Manufacturer of optical technology and Service Provider, acquired the assets of Plasmon (including UDO and UDO2 technology) in a liquidation sale. ASTI currently sells and supports UDO technologies sold under the Plasmon brand.

== Specifications ==
ECMA-380: Data Interchange on 130 mm Rewritable and Write Once Read Many Ultra Density Optical (UDO) Disk Cartridges –Capacity: 60 Gigabytes per Cartridge – Second Generation

=== Writing technology ===
UDO uses a Phase Change recording process that permanently alters the molecular structure of the disc surface.

=== Disc format ===
There are three versions of UDO/UDO media: a True WORM (Write Once Read Many), an R/W (Rewritable), and Compliant WORM (shreddable WORM).

Rewritable
The UDO Rewritable format uses a specially formulated Phase Change recording surface that allows recorded data to be deleted and modified. In practice, UDO rewritable media operates like a standard magnetic disc. Files can be written, erased and rewritten, dynamically reallocating disc capacity. Rewritable media is typically used in archive applications where the stability and longevity of optical media are important, but archive records change on a relatively frequent or discretionary basis. Rewritable media is typically used in archive environments where data needs to be deleted or media capacity re-used.
True write once
The UDO True Write Once format uses a different phase change recording surface than the rewritable media. Unlike rewritable media, the write once recording surface cannot be erased or altered, making Write Once the most stable in terms of data integrity, because the physical record is kept authentic. This level of data integrity is not usually matched by other magnetic disc or tape technologies using normal write once emulation.
Compliant write once media
UDO Compliant Write Once media has the same operational properties as UDO True Write Once media but with one clear and important difference. Through the use of a specially designed "shred" operation, individual records written to Compliant Write Once media can be destroyed once their retention period expires. The shred function is controlled at an application level and operates only on Compliant Write Once media.

== Magneto-optical comparison ==
The table below summarizes the differences between conventional Magneto-Optical specifications and those of the enhanced Ultra Density Optical disc.

Disc	5.25-inch UDO Rewriteable	5.25-inch UDO Write Once	5.25-inch MO system (9.1 GB)
Disc diameter	130 mm	130 mm	130 mm
Disc thickness	2.4 mm	2.4 mm	2.4 mm
Cartridge size	Same as ISO 130 mm (135 x 153 x 11 mm)	Same as ISO 130 mm (135 x 153 x 11 mm)	ISO 130 mm (135 x 153 x 11 mm)
Number of physical tracks	96,964	96,964	49,728
Sector size	8 kB	8 kB	4 kB
Number of sectors	2,504,407	2,504,407	1,118,880
Data area	29.0–61.0 mm	29.0–61.0 mm	29.7–62.5 mm
Designated (Note: Different types of lasers may read the disc depending on the pit sizes but not write.) laser wavelength	Violet (405 nm)	Violet (405 nm)	660 nm
Objective lens (NA)	0.85	0.85	0.575
Recording layer	Phase change	Phase change	Magneto-optical
Recording format	Land & groove	Land & groove	Land & groove
Recording side	Both sides	Both sides	Both sides
Track pitch	0.33 μm	0.33 μm	0.65 μm
Minimum bit length	0.13 μm	0.13 μm	0.3 μm
Recording density	15.0 Gb/in²	15.0 Gb/in²	3.3 Gb/in²
Transfer rate	4–8 MB/s	4–8 MB/s	3–6 MB/s
Error correction	LDC	LDC	LDC
Modulation	RLL (1,7)	RLL (1,7)	RLL (1,7)

=== Drive mechanism ===
UDO Drives Specifications Summary

- Media Load Time 5 s
- Media Unload Time 3 s
- Average Seek Time 35 ms
- Buffer Memory 32 MB
- Max Sustained Transfer Rate – Read 8 MB/s (this is on the outer diameter of the media only the inner diameter is a max of 4 MB/sec)
- Max Sustained Transfer Rate – Write 4 MB/s (with verification on outer diameter of media only)
- MSBF – Mean Swap Between Failure 750,000 load/unload cycles
- MTBF – Mean Time Between Failure 100,000 hours
- Interface Wide Ultra 2 LVD SCSI

UDO comes in both internal and external drive guises. External drives are also available as part a robotic autoloader. All current drives are designed for heavy duty use.

=== Laser and optics ===
UDO systems use a blue-violet laser operating at a wavelength of 405 nm, similar to the one used in Blu-ray Disc, to read and write data. Conventional MOs use red lasers at 660 nm.

The blue-violet laser's shorter wavelength makes it possible to store more information on a 13 cm sized UDO disc. The minimum "spot size" on which a laser can be focused is limited by diffraction, and depends on the wavelength of the light and the numerical aperture of the lens used to focus it. By decreasing the wavelength, using a higher numerical aperture (0.85, compared with 0.575 for MO), the laser beam can be focused much more tightly. This produces a smaller spot on the disc than in existing MOs, and allows more information to be physically stored in the same area.

The opto-mechanism design of current Plasmon UDO drives was jointly developed with Asahi Pentax.

== Applications ==
=== Archival storage ===
Currently UDO has an expected data archival life of around 50 years. Apart from the storage size, the discs (like Magneto Optical discs) are designed for durability and long term reliability.

=== Secure video ===
A company called Blu-Laser Cinema announced in June 2005 that it was launching a new player using the UDO format to provide a secure viewing and editing platform for film production houses. Targeted towards the high-end video editing and production community, the unit featured a smart card reader and a USB dongle with an embedded biometric fingerprint reader to allow access only to authorized users.

== Features ==
The core technology for UDO is essentially similar to Blu-ray Discs, as well as PDD (all were developed by Sony), although there are a number of key differences; the primary ones being:

Data authenticity and integrity
UDO provides absolute data authenticity for applications where archived information must remain 100% unchanged – banks and legal institutions, for example. UDO uses a phase change recording process that permanently alters the molecular structure of true write once media, ensuring data is integral at the most fundamental level.
Long-term data retention
Long term archival storage. The design of the UDO, with a tested, stable recording surface, protective coating, and encasement in a cartridge, is expected to give it at least 50 years storage life, minimizing the frequency of data migration and management for firms requiring storage for large amounts of important data. The UDO disc design is a robust design and reduces the potential for contamination of media.
High capacity and scalability
Blue laser technology gives the 30 GB UDO more than three times the capacity of previous generation MO (Magneto Optical) and DVD technologies. Being removable, UDO cartridges, combined with off-line media management capabilities typical of optical storage libraries, makes UDO a much more scalable format. Rarely used data can be removed from a library, freeing up capacity yet remaining managed and accessible.
Rapid information access
UDO has a fast 35-millisecond random access capability. An 8 KB sector size helps read/write performance across a wide range of file sizes. UDO is slightly faster as it operates at Constant Angular Velocity (CAV); during reads and writes, the disc spins continuously at a very high speed. In rewritable applications, UDO has a unique, direct over-write capability, doubling rewrite speeds by eliminating the need for a dedicated erase pass.
Low total cost of ownership
The cost of a UDO media compares favorably with MO or DVD solutions and has a higher capacity. UDO's ISO standard 5.25-inch (133 mm) media cartridge allows the use of MO and UDO media in the same library, if supported by the connectivity software and the controlling application. EMC Legato DiskXtender, one of the most popular Library management and connectivity software does not support this mode of operation.
