= Professional Disc =

Proprietary optical disc format developed by Sony for storing digital video

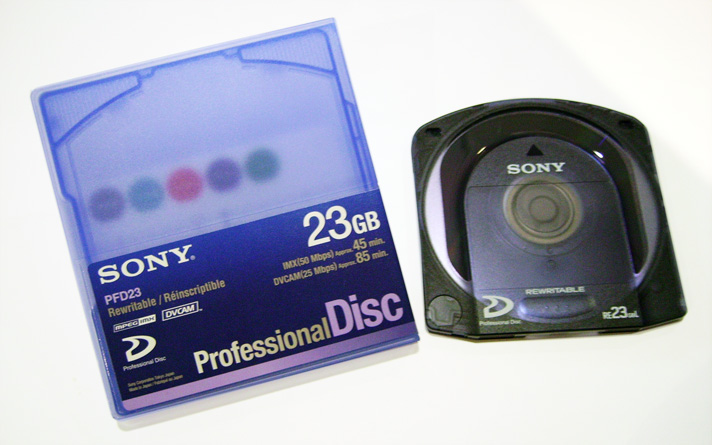
- Media type: Optical disc
- Capacity: 23 GB per layer
- Read mechanism: 405 nm diode laser
- Write mechanism: 405 nm diode laser with a focused beam using more power than for reading
- Developed by: Sony
- Dimensions: 12 cm (4.7 in) diameter; 1.2 mm (0.047 in) thickness
- Usage: Data storage
- Extended from: DVD
- Extended to: Blu-ray
- Released: 2003; 23 years ago

Professional Disc (PFD) is a digital recording optical disc format introduced by Sony in 2003 primarily for XDCAM, its tapeless camcorder system. It was one of the first optical formats to utilize a blue laser, which allowed for a higher density of data to be stored on optical media compared to infrared laser technology used in the CD and red laser technology used in the DVD format.

== Technology ==
PFD uses a 405 nm wavelength and a numerical aperture (NA) of 0.85 for the laser, allowing 23 GB of data to be stored on one 12 cm disc – the equivalent to nearly five single-layer DVDs, and a 1x speed data transfer rate of 88 Mbit/s for reading and 72 Mbit/s for writing. After the 23 GB disc was released, a dual-layer 50 GB was developed and released.

This format is sometimes confused with the Blu-ray Disc format, another optical disc format using blue-violet lasers and supported by Sony. Even the PFD's caddy and Blu-ray's original caddy (later dropped) looked very similar. Capabilities differ; single-layer PFD discs have a capacity of 23 GB whereas Blu-ray discs can store 25 GB. PFDs are prohibitively expensive for the consumer segment to which Blu-ray is aimed. PFD discs can have a capacity of up to 100 GB for rewritable discs, and 128 GB for write-once discs.

== Sizes ==
Disc size (GB)	Disc color	Layers of disc	Storage time (minutes record using HD422 50 Mbit/s)	Properties
23	Black	Single	45	Rewritable
50	Red	Dual	90	Rewritable
100	Yellow	Triple	180	Rewritable
128	White	Quad	240	Write once

== Applications/products ==
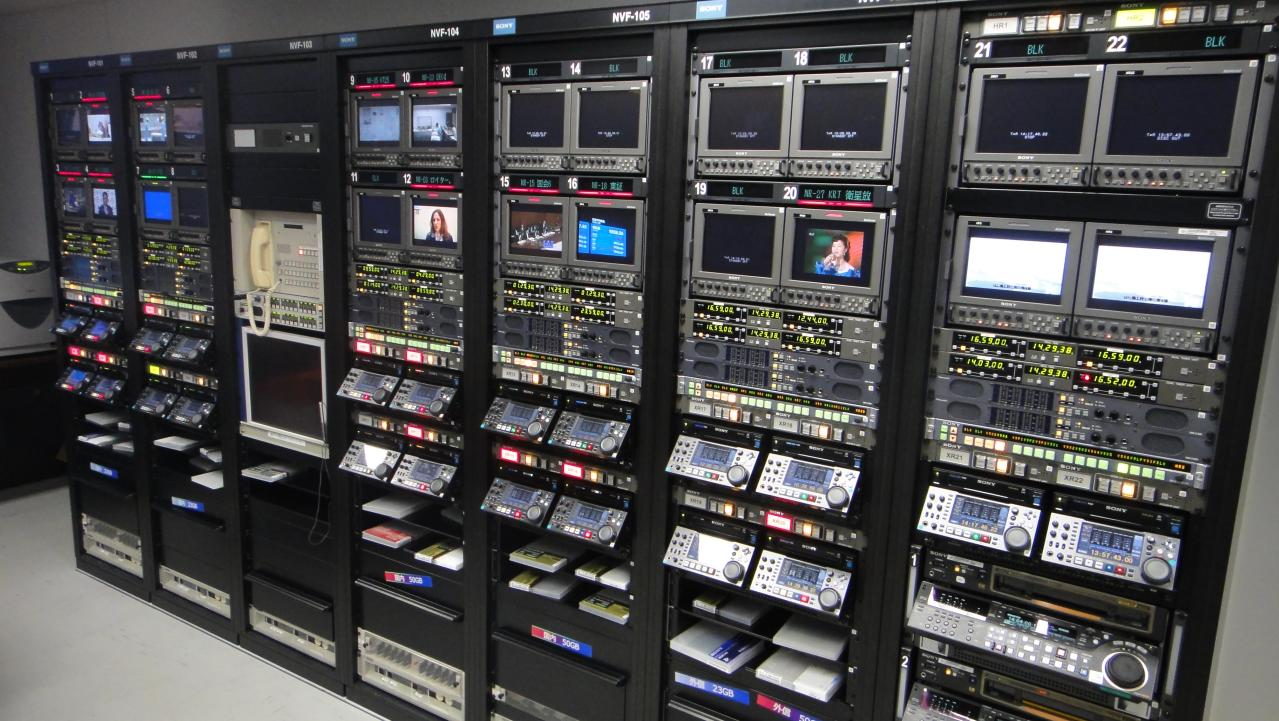
19-inch racks of Professional Disc decks at Fuji TV

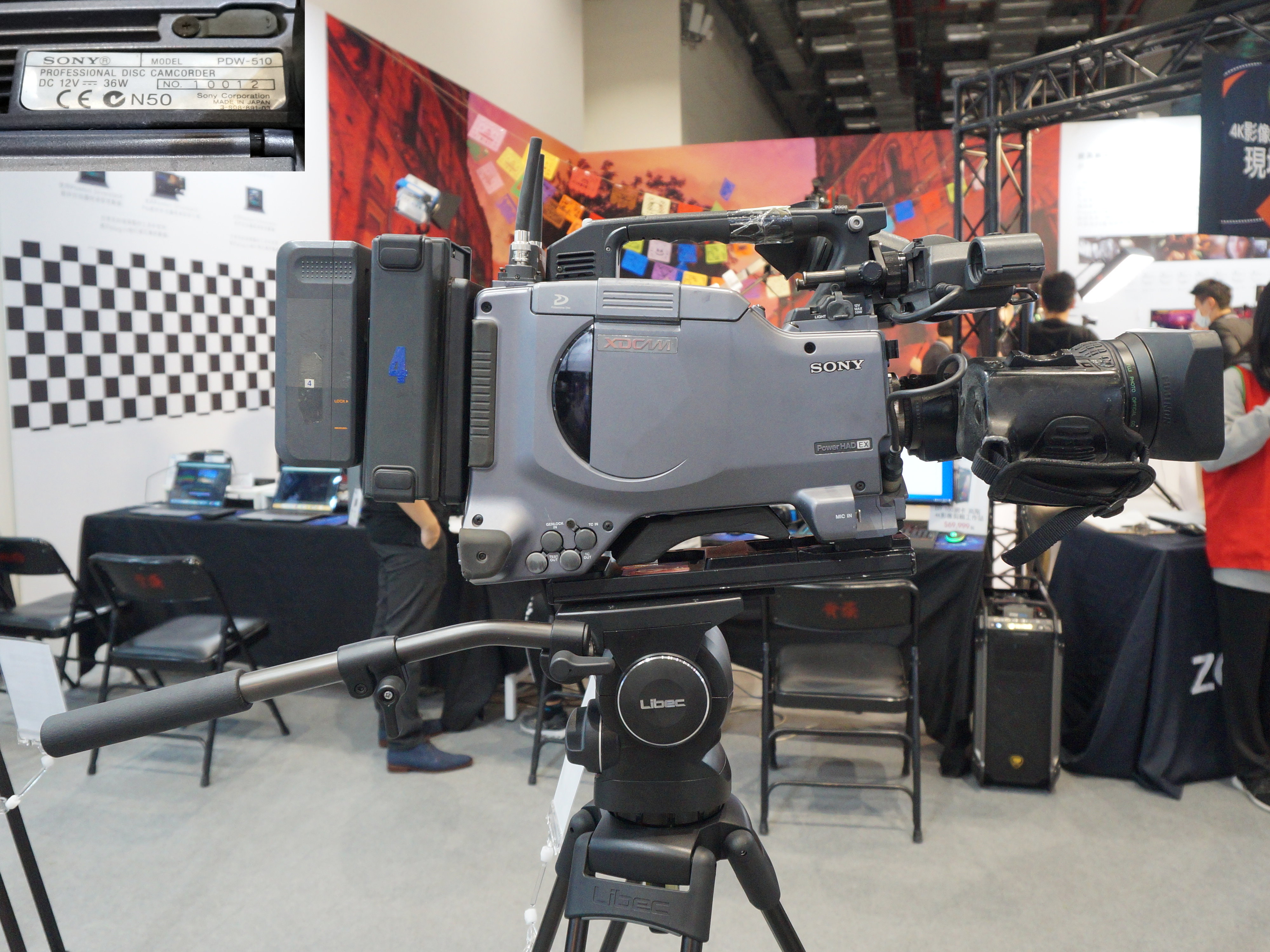
Professional Disc camcorder Sony PDW-510

=== XDCAM video system ===
The PFD format is used as the recording medium in Sony's XDCAM professional video devices, both for standard definition and high definition applications.

=== Professional Disc for Data (PDD) ===
Professional Disc for DATA (PDD or ProDATA) was a general-use recording media variant of PFD, aimed primarily at small and medium-sized enterprise for data archival and backup. PDD drives and media became available in mid-2004. The BW-RS101 external SCSI-3 drive originally retailed in the UK at £2,344 (excl. VAT) directly from Sony, and 23 GB write-once and re-writeable media retailed for £30 each. Two other drives – the BW-F101/A internal SCSI drive and the BW-RU101 external USB 2.0 drive also became available around the same time.

On March 31, 2007, Professional Disc for DATA reached their "end of life". PFD are still being manufactured and used in Sony XDCAM devices. Sony states that PDD and PFD media are not compatible, but does not specify the exact differences between products.

Sony's PDW-U1 Professional Disc drive is an external drive that connects via USB 2.0 to Windows or Mac OS X computers using the included free software from Sony. In a firmware and software upgrade in late July 2009, Sony added the ability for computer users to store any computer files on the Professional Disc into the dedicated "User Data" folder.

== See also ==
- Blu-ray
- HD DVD
- Ultra Density Optical
- Optical disc
