= Comparison of popular optical data-storage systems =

As of 2021, multiple consumer-oriented, optical-disk media formats are or were available:

- Compact Disc ("CD"): digital audio disc
  - CD-R: write once read many (WORM) CD
  - CD-RW: rewriteable CD
- DVD: digital video disc
  - DVD-R: WORM DVD defined by the DVD Forum
  - DVD-RW: rewritable DVD defined by DVD Forum
  - DVD+R: WORM DVD defined by the DVD+RW Alliance
  - DVD+RW: rewriteable DVD defined by DVD+RW Alliance
  - DVD-RAM rewriteable, capable of random write access, not generally format-compatible with DVD
- Blu-ray Disc: DVD successor, capable of high-definition video
  - BD-R: WORM Blu-ray Disc by the Blu-ray Disc Association
  - BD-RE: rewriteable BD
- HD DVD: failed HD format defined by the DVD Forum
- Ultra HD Blu-ray: BD successor, capable of 4K resolution

== Overview ==
=== Nomenclature ===
In optical storage, three types of storage are usually recognized, and given customary abbreviations: read-only ("ROM"), Write once ("R") and read/writable ("RW", or for Blu-ray, "E" for "erasable"). Examples:

- CD-ROM represents the CD format, in its pre-recorded "read only" use
- DVD+R represents a DVD "+" disc which can be written once only
- DVD-RW represents a DVD "-" disc which can be read or written many times
- BD-RE represents a Blu-ray disc which can be read or written many times.

In addition some of these media support MultiLevel Recording formats, for example dual layer (written as "DL"), and DVD also supports a "RAM" version (similar to RW), although this is not widely used in the popular consumer market.

=== Coverage ===
DVD has three variants, known as "+", "-" and "RAM". For the purposes of this article, DVD+ and DVD- are considered together as "DVD"; they share many of the same characteristics. Differences are noted below.

DVD-RAM, which did not gain wide penetration of the consumer market, is discussed briefly in the same section but otherwise excluded from the article.

ROM formats are excluded; they perform rather like write-once "R" formats, without the capacity to write to the disc. Likewise other niche formats are excluded, such as GD-ROM (used by some Sega game consoles) and Ultra Density Optical and the like (commercial archiving storage rather than mass market).

Thus the article covers the following popular recordable formats: CD (CD-R, CD-RW); DVD (DVD±R, DVD±RW); HD DVD (); Blu-ray (BD-R, BD-E), and for all except CD, their respective dual- or multi-layer formats.

== History ==
Although research into optical data storage has been ongoing for many decades, the first popular system was CD, introduced in 1982, adapted from audio (CD-DA) to data storage (the CD-ROM format) with the 1985 Yellow Book, and re-adapted as the first mass market optical storage medium with CD-R and CD-RW in 1988. Compact Disc is still the de facto standard for audio recordings, although its place for other multimedia recordings and optical data storage has largely been superseded by DVD.

DVD (initially an acronym of "Digital Video Disc", then backronymed as "Digital Versatile Disc" and officially just "DVD") was the mass market successor to CD. DVD was rolled out in 1996, again initially for video and audio. DVD recordable formats developed some time later: DVD- in late 1997 and DVD+ in 2002. Although DVD was initially intended to prevent a format war in fact one did arise between these two formats. It was resolved with both surviving however: DVD-R predominating for stand-alone DVD recorders and players, and (for computers) most DVD devices being engineered as dual format, to be compatible with both. As of 2007 DVD is the de facto standard for pre-recorded movies, and popular storage of data beyond the capacity of CD.

With the development of high-definition television, and the popularization of broadband and digital storage of movies, a further format development took place, again giving rise to two camps: HD DVD and Blu-ray, based upon a switch from red to blue-violet laser and tighter engineering tolerances. As of 2007 both have significant releases in the pre-recorded movie sector, but they are still only commencing their roll-out for data storage and more general use, and have as yet made little impact on the global market for data storage. The result of this format war is not yet determined.

== Technology comparisons ==
=== Speed ===
Optical device speeds are often quoted as a multiple of a "basic speed" for that type of device. Thus for CD, the basic speed is 150 kB/s, so a CD-recordable device may be quoted as "4x" or "6x" to indicate a speed of 600 kB/s and 900 kB/s respectively.

Typical values are:

CD

Speed	MB/s
1x	0.15
4x	0.6
24x	3.6
48x	7.2
52x	7.8

DVD

Speed	MB/s	CD equivalent
1x	1.32	9x
4x	5.28	36x
6x	7.93	54x
12x	15.85	--
16x	21.13	--

Blu-ray

Speed	MB/s	DVD equivalent
1x	4.5	3x
2x	9.0	7x
4x	18.0	14x

Also, these speeds are not constant, and are usually a measure of the maximum possible speed a drive can achieve.

=== Data Capacity ===
Name	Capacity	Experimental (Note: Prototypes and theoretical values.)	Years (Note: Years from (known) start of development till end of sales or development.)
Compact disc (CD)	0.7–0.9 GB		1982–present
Digital Versatile Disc (DVD)	4.7–17 GB		1995–present
HD DVD	15–51 GB	1 TB	2002-2008
Blu-ray Disc (BD)	25 GB; 50 GB		2002–present
Ultra HD Blu-ray	50 GB; 66 GB; 100 GB; 128 GB		2015–present
BDXL	100 GB, 128 GB	1 TB	2010–present
Millennial Disc (M-DISC)	4.7 GB (DVD format); 25 GB (Blu-ray format); 50 GB (Blu-ray format); 100 GB (BDXL format)		2009–present

== Other information ==
=== Optical storage devices excluded from article ===
The following are examples of optical storage media excluded from this article:

- Holographic data storage - either still in development, or available but generally only encountered in niche usage as of 2007.
- Laserdisc - not used for recordable data storage in the computing world, although recordable formats did exist briefly.
- Optical jukebox - hold massive amounts of data on multiple discs allowing scalability into the petabyte range.

== See also ==
- Optical storage
- Holographic data storage
- Holographic versatile disc
- MultiLevel Recording
- Comparison of high definition optical disc formats
