= MMC3 =

MMC3 may refer to:

- MMC3, a Memory Management Controller used in Nintendo Entertainment System games
- MMC-3, one of the designations of the USS Triumph (AM-323) minesweeper ship
- MMC-3, SCSI Multimedia Commands - 3
