= DVD+R DL =

DVD Recordable Dual Layer

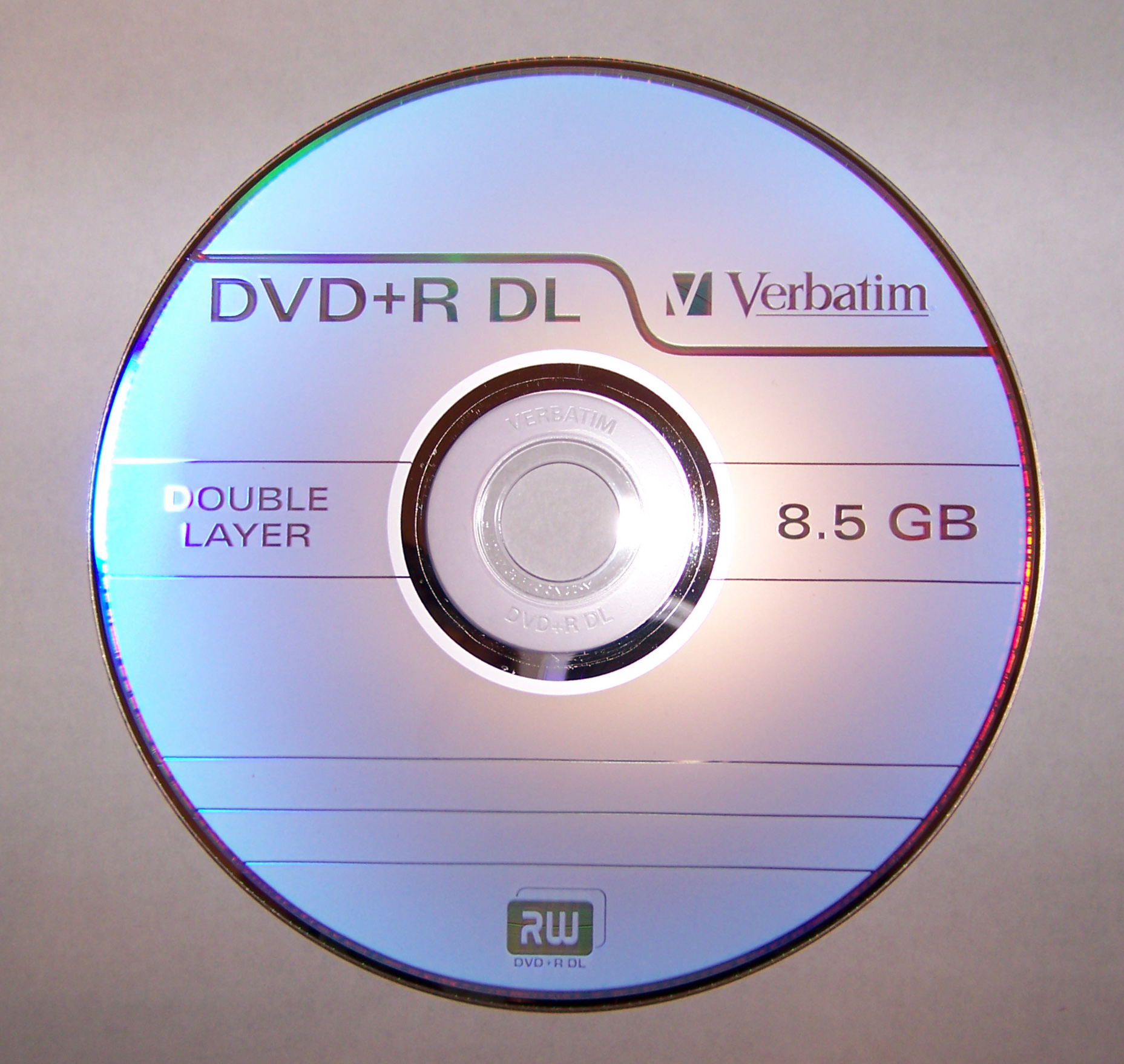
A DVD+R DL disc by Verbatim

DVD+R DL (DL stands for Double Layer), also called DVD+R9, is a derivative of the DVD+R format created by the DVD+RW Alliance. Its use was first demonstrated in October 2003. DVD+R DL discs employ two recordable dye layers, each capable of storing nearly the 4.7 GB capacity of a single-layer disc, almost doubling the total disc capacity to 8.5 GB. Discs can be read in many DVD devices (older units are less compatible) and can only be created using DVD+R DL and Super Multi drives.

DL drives started appearing on the market during mid-2004, at prices comparable to those of existing single-layer drives. As of March 2011 DL media is up to twice as expensive as single-layer media. The latest DL drives write double layer discs at a slower rate (up to 12×) than current single-layer discs (up to 24×).

DVD+R DL	Capacity
Physical size	GB
12 cm, single/dual layer	4.7 / 8.5
8 cm, single/dual layer	2.6 / 5.2

== Dual-layer recording ==
Dual-layer recording allows DVD-R and DVD+R discs to store significantly more data, up to 8.5 gigabytes per disc, compared with 4.7 gigabytes for single-layer discs. DVD-R DL was developed for the DVD Forum by Pioneer Corporation, while DVD+R DL was developed for the DVD+RW Alliance by Philips and Mitsubishi Kagaku Media (MKM).

A dual-layer disc differs from its usual DVD counterpart by employing a second physical layer within the disc itself. The drive with dual-layer capability accesses the second layer by shining the laser through the first semi-transparent layer. The layer change can exhibit a noticeable pause in some DVD players, up to several seconds. This caused some viewers to worry that their dual-layer discs were damaged or defective. Studios began listing a standard message explaining this pausing effect on all dual-layer disc packaging.

DVD recordable discs supporting this technology are backward compatible with some existing DVD players and DVD-ROM drives. Many current DVD recorders support dual-layer technology, and the price is now comparable to that of single-layer drives, though the blank media remain more expensive. The transfer rates reached by dual-layer media for both reading and recording speeds are still well below those of single-layer media.

There are two modes for dual-layer orientation, parallel track path (PTP) and opposite track path (OTP). In PTP mode, used for DVD-ROM, both layers start recording at the inside diameter (ID) with the lead-in and end at the outside diameter (OD) with the lead-out. Sectors are sequenced from the beginning of the first layer to the end of the first layer, then the beginning of the second layer to the end of the second layer. In OTP mode, the second layer is read from the outside of the disk.

For DVD-Video a variation of the technique is employed. DVD-Video is always recorded in OTP mode, but the video data is read from the beginning of the first layer towards the end of the first layer, when this ends (not necessarily at the end of the track) then reading is transferred to the second layer, but the video data commences from the same physical location that the first layer ends back towards the beginning of the second layer. This means that the 'start' of the second layer may not have any recorded material present. This is to minimize the time that the video player takes to locate and focus on the second layer and thus provide the shortest possible pause in the content as the layer changes.

A common misconception is that the disc spins first in one direction, and then another, either for PTP or OTP recording, when in fact DVD-Writers always spin a disc in the clockwise direction. A simpler way to understand what's written above is to think of the little hole in the centre of the DVD as the "inside" and the rim of the DVD as the "outside". Since dual-layer DVDs have two data layers, placed one on top of the other – Layer 0 (L0) and Layer 1 (L1), there are two ways in which these two layers may be written to – L0, inside to outside and then L1 inside to outside again (PTP), or L0 inside to outside and then L1 outside to inside (OTP). OTP is usually used for DVD-Video, to prevent the inherent delay that PTP involves: in PTP, the laser head moves from the outside edge of the DVD to the inside to start reading L1 when it reaches the end of L0. This results in the video skipping or freezing up for some time as the laser head repositions itself and the system waits to start receiving data again.

== Recordable DVD capacity comparison ==
For comparison, the table below shows storage capacities of the four most common DVD recordable media, excluding DVD-RAM. (SL) stands for standard single-layer discs, while DL denotes the dual-layer variants. See articles on the formats in question for information on compatibility issues.

Disk Type	number of sectors for data (2,048 B each)	capacity in bytes	nominal capacity in GB
DVD-R (SL)	2,298,496	4,707,319,808	4.7
DVD+R (SL)	2,295,104	4,700,372,992	4.7
DVD-R DL	4,171,712	8,543,666,176	8.5
DVD+R DL	4,173,824	8,547,991,552	8.5

== See also ==
- DVD-R DL
- DVD
- DVD+R
- DVD+RW
- DVD+RW DL
- Book type
- MultiLevel Recording
- List of optical disc manufacturers
