= Nintendo 64 Game Pak =

Nintendo 64 storage medium

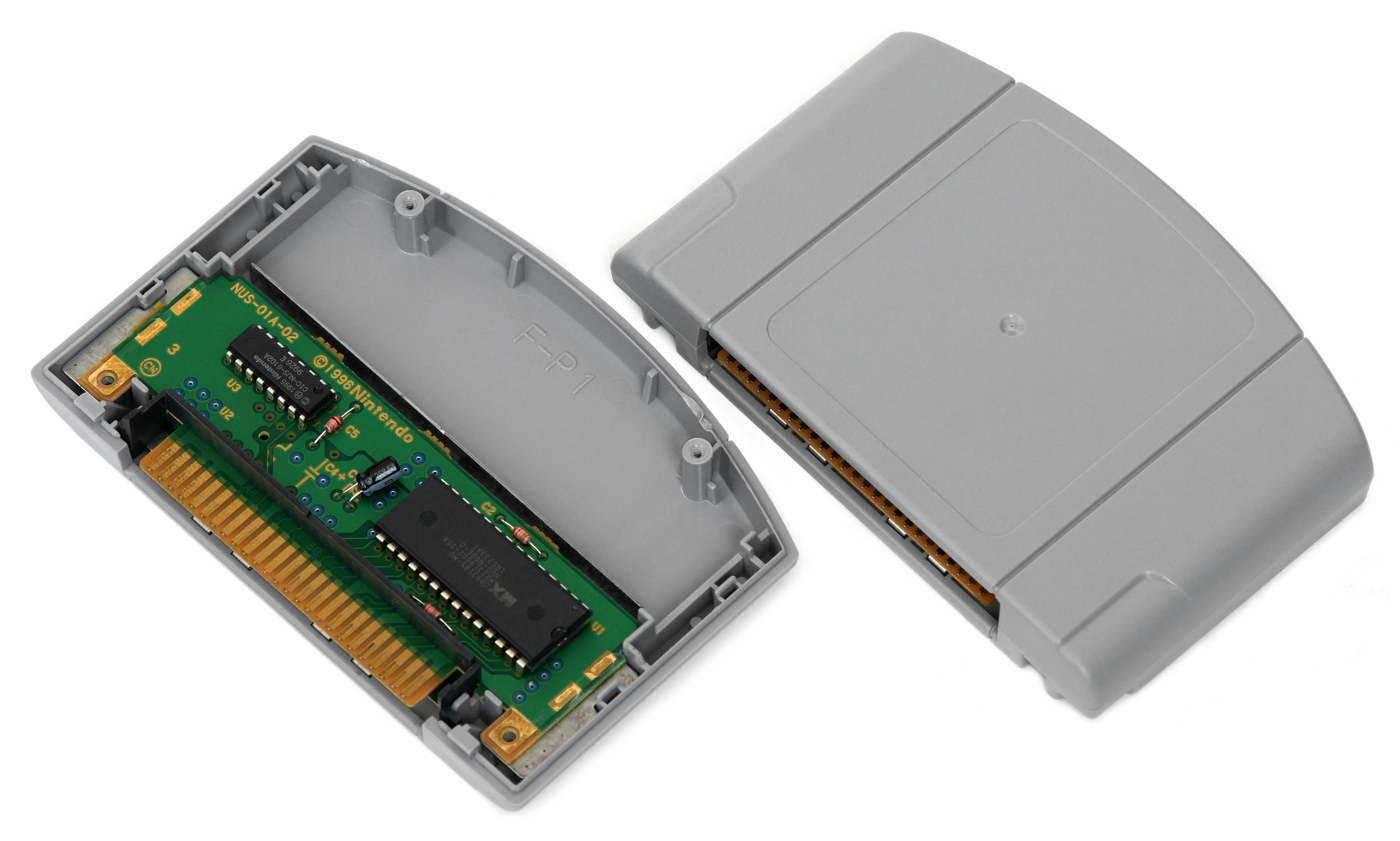
- Open and unopened N64 Game Pak
- Media type: ROM cartridge
- Encoding: Digital
- Capacity: 4–64 MB
- Read mechanism: 5–50 MB/s
- Standard: Proprietary
- Developed by: Nintendo
- Dimensions: 7.66 cm (3.02 in) high × 11.6 cm (4.6 in) wide × 1.85 cm (0.73 in) thick
- Usage: Nintendo 64

Nintendo 64 Game Pak (Note: Known in Japan as Cassette (カセット, Kasetto)) (part number NUS-006) is the brand name of the ROM cartridges that store game data for the Nintendo 64. As with Nintendo's previous consoles, the Game Pak's design strategy was intended to achieve maximal read speed and lower console manufacturing costs through not integrating a mechanical drive, with a drawback of lower per dollar storage capacity compared to a disk. From the console's first year from late 1996 through 1997, Game Pak sizes were 4 to 12 megabytes with a typical third party retail price of US$75.99 (equivalent to about $150 in 2025), then available in 32 megabytes in 1998, and finally 64 megabytes from 1999 onwards.

As with the Famicom Disk System floppy drive of the 1980s, Nintendo sought a higher-capacity and cheaper medium to complement the Game Pak, resulting in the 64DD—a Japan-only floppy drive peripheral which launched late in 1999 and was a commercial failure.

Some developers such as Factor 5, Rare, and Nintendo were supportive of the solid-state medium due to fast read speeds and bank switching. Some other developers had vastly heavier designs, such as the use of full-motion video, but sufficient data compression techniques had not yet been invented and ROM chips were not yet cost-efficient, leading many developers like Square to target CD-ROM based platforms instead.

The Nintendo 64 was the last major home console to use cartridges as its primary storage format, while the hybrid Nintendo Switch was released in 2017. Portable systems such as the PlayStation Vita, Nintendo DS, and Nintendo 3DS also used cartridges where their home contemporaries had not.

== History ==
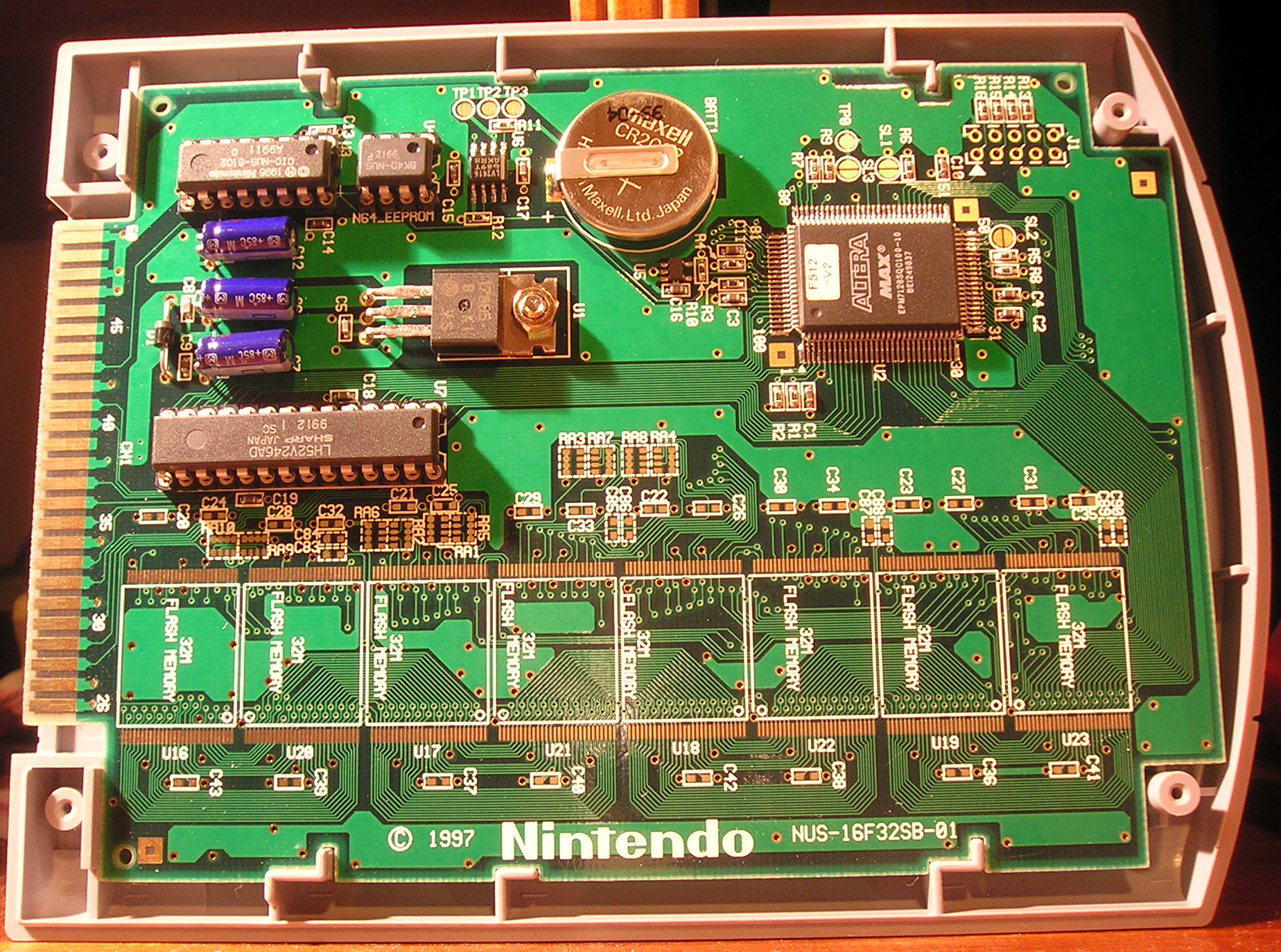
Development cartridge internals

Nintendo had already invested into high-capacity secondary storage devices with the Famicom Disk System and the cancelled SNES-CD for their previous two home consoles. In a 1994 interview, Nintendo of America (NOA) summarised its analysis of the advantages of cartridges and CDs with respect to its next console—eventually the Nintendo 64.

Right now, cartridges offer faster access time and more speed of movement and characters than CDs. So, we'll introduce our new hardware with cartridges. But eventually these problems with CDs will be overcome. When that happens, you'll see Nintendo using CD as the software storage medium for our 64-bit system.

— Howard Lincoln, chairman of Nintendo of America, Billboard

That sentiment was soon revised in the same year when NOA's Vice President of Sales & Marketing Peter Main stated that "The choice we made is not cartridge versus CD, it's silicon over optical. When it comes to speed, no other format approaches the silicon-based cartridge."

At Shoshinkai 1995, Nintendo announced the complementary 64DD, a rewritable magnetic disk drive for the then-upcoming Nintendo 64 with several times faster transfer rates and seek time than competing CD-ROM consoles. In 1997, Nintendo game designer Shigesato Itoi explained, "CD holds a lot of data, [64]DD holds a moderate amount of data and backs the data up, and [cartridge] ROMs hold the least data and processes the fastest. By attaching a DD to the game console, we can drastically increase the number of possible genres. ... I think we'll make the game on a cartridge first, then ... finish it up as a full-out 64DD game." Many 64DD games entered development; however, after the device's launch was delayed several years until 1999 and restricted to Japan, many of these games switched to the Game Pak or were outright cancelled. The 64DD was a commercial failure and was discontinued only 14 months after launch.

In 1996, prior to the Nintendo 64's launch, President of Nintendo Hiroshi Yamauchi praised the user experience of the cartridge format:

Many of you feel that CD-ROM is the call of the day ... but look at the latest buzzword in the computer world — plug-and-play — which is nothing but [Nintendo] culture ... Customers [think] having no loading time is a great advantage. More importantly, by using [cartridge], other chips can later be incorporated into the cartridge, which allows Nintendo to offer new game opportunities to game developers.

— President of Nintendo Hiroshi Yamauchi, Billboard

Until the launch of the Switch in 2017, the Nintendo 64 was the latest major home console to use the cartridge as its primary storage format, and most handheld systems except the PlayStation Portable use cartridges. Most home systems since the fifth generation use disc, flash, and online formats. The succeeding GameCube uses an optical disc format, in a boon to some developers. The company stated its goal was to reduce manufacturing costs and did not cite storage space as a rationale. Because the new console lacks backwards compatibility with Nintendo 64 Game Paks, Nintendo said players could simply keep their Nintendo 64.

== Features ==
=== Save files ===
Some Game Paks include internal EEPROM, flash memory, or battery-backed-up RAM for saved game storage. Otherwise, game saves may be stored on a separate memory card, marketed by Nintendo as a Controller Pak.

=== Copy protection ===
Each Nintendo 64 Game Pak contains a lockout chip (conceptually similar to the 10NES) to prevent production of unlicensed games and piracy. Unlike previous Nintendo systems, the Nintendo 64 lockout chip contains a seed value which is used to calculate a checksum of the game's boot code. To prevent playing of illegitimate games by piggybacking on a real Game Pak – as was a common workaround for the NES – Nintendo produced five different versions of the lockout chip. During the boot process, and occasionally while the game is running, the console computes the checksum of the boot code and verifies it with the lockout chip in the Game Pak, failing to boot if the check fails.

On June 2, 1997, a U.S. District Court issued a temporary restraining order against Games City for its Game Doctor and Doctor V64 products, which allow users to copy from a Game Pak to a CD or hard disk drive. Games City was ordered to stop importing, distributing, advertising, or selling any such devices.

=== Regional lockout ===
Two small indentations on the back of each cartridge allow it to connect or pass through the system's cartridge dustcover flaps. All regions have the same connectors, and region-locked cartridges will fit into the other regions' systems by using a cartridge converter or by simply removing the cartridge's casing. However, the systems are also equipped with lockout chips that will only allow them to play their appropriate games. Both Japanese and North American systems have the same NTSC lockout, and Europe has a PAL lockout. A bypass device such as the N64 Passport or the Datel Action Replay can be used to play import games, but a few require an additional boot code.

=== Modem ===
The cartridge for the officially licensed Japanese game Morita Shogi 64, featured a modem and a custom shell to accommodate an RJ11 port and activity LED.

== Analysis ==
The Nintendo 64 Game Pak medium provides essential benefits alongside drawbacks. Though it provides the faster load times and greater durability than the CD-ROM format, its solid-state silicon could not be produced as quickly and was more expensive to manufacture, leading to low storage capacity.

For example, a Top Gun video game was announced in 1995 as a launch title for the Nintendo 64 and then cancelled five months prior to the system's launch, partially due to the additional lead time of ordering the more expensive proprietary cartridge format, plus Nintendo's licensing fees. The game's developer, Spectrum Holobyte, said, "The question is, does Nintendo really think it needs licensees? It seems to want the lion's share of the software sales, possibly as much as two thirds."

In 1997, journalist Alex S. Kasten observed that the issue "goes beyond the economics of the media [because] market strategy and style of game play also factor into the cartridge/CD decision [so] Nintendo has remained cartridge-based for two main reasons: economics and performance."

=== Console cost ===
Nintendo knew that a CD-ROM drive would greatly increase the cost of the console in a price-sensitive market. Nintendo software engineering manager Jim Merrick said, "We're very sensitive to the cost of the console. We could get an eight-speed CD-ROM mechanism in the unit, but in the under-$200 console market, it would be hard to pull that off."

=== Performance ===
We use the cartridge almost like normal RAM... So the cartridge technology really saved the day.

— Factor 5

Specified at 5 to 50 MiB/s, Nintendo emphasised the Game Pak' fast load times in comparison to the competing Sega Saturn and Sony PlayStation's 2× CD-ROM drives running at about 300 kB/s with high latency. This speed discrepancy can be observed through the loading screens that appear in many multiplatform games; such screens were often nonexistent on the Nintendo 64 version. Bank switching was a common practice for developers in many games, such as Nintendo EAD's Super Mario 64 or Factor 5's Indiana Jones and the Infernal Machine, which allowed for efficient memory usage. Howard Lincoln said, "[Genyo Takeda, the Nintendo engineer working with Silicon Graphics to design Project Reality] and those guys felt very strongly that it was absolutely essential to have it on a cartridge in order to do the kind of things that we wanted to do with Super Mario."

Sega countered by claiming that load times on CD-ROMs could eventually be minimised. Ted Hoff, vice president of sales and marketing at Sega, said "We are finding more and more ways to mask the load factor [...] We are working out ways to overlay or leapfrog the loading time."

=== Durability ===
Game Paks are far more durable than compact discs, the latter of which must be carefully used and stored in protective cases. It also prevents accidental scratches and subsequent read errors. While Game Paks are more resistant than CDs to physical damage, they are sometimes less resistant to long-term environmental damage, particularly oxidation (although this can be simply cleaned off), wear of their electrical contacts, or static electricity.

=== Manufacturing cost ===
Due to the complex manufacturing processes, cartridge-based games are more expensive and difficult to manufacture than their disk-based counterparts. PlayStation CD-ROMs reportedly cost US$1 (equivalent to about $2 in 2025) to manufacture, while cartridges for the Super Nintendo Entertainment System cost $15 ($31) and Nintendo 64 cartridges reportedly as much as over $30 ($62).

Prices also depended on ROM capacity and whether a cartridge supports saves. By 1996 the average price of a 4 MB (32 Mbit) mask ROM, typical for advanced Super NES games later in its life cycle, was around $10, while the price for a 2 MB (16 Mbit) mask ROM was around $6.50. At the same time, an 8 MB (64 Mbit) mask ROM cost around $15 and a 16 MB (128 Mbit) mask ROM twice that.

Publishers passed these expenses to the consumer, so Nintendo 64 games tended toward higher prices than PlayStation games. Rarely did a PlayStation game exceed $50 (equivalent to about $103 in 2025), whereas some Nintendo 64 cartridges were $79.99 ($158) like the first print of The Legend of Zelda: Ocarina of Time. Games in Sony's Greatest Hits budget line retailed for $19.95 ($39), whereas Nintendo's equivalent Player's Choice line retailed for $39.95 ($79). In August 1997, Kelly Flock, president of Sony Interactive Studios America (SISA) said "Most N64 carts are costing consumers $55 to $70, compared with $20 to $50 for a PlayStation CD." In the United States, the typical price of a third-party game was around $75.99 ($152) in the system's first year on the market in 1997, though this dropped incrementally after Nintendo reduced wholesale prices on the cartridges. NOA Vice President George Harrison was enthused about the increasing third-party cartridge orders placed after that price drop. In the United Kingdom, Nintendo 64 games were priced £54.95 (equivalent to £108.32 in 2025) at release, with PlayStation games priced at £44.95 (equivalent to £88.61 in 2025).

=== Manufacturing time ===
Game Paks took longer to manufacture than CDs, with each production run taking at least two weeks from order to delivery. By contrast, extra copies of a CD based game could be ordered with a lead time of a few days. This meant that publishers of Nintendo 64 games had less flexibility to forecast demand and risked being left with a surplus of expensive Game Paks for a failed game or a weeks-long shortage of product they underestimated.

Sony used this shortcoming to appeal to publishers. Andrew House, Vice President of Marketing at Sony Computer Entertainment America, said "They can manufacture the appropriate amount of software without taking a tremendous inventory risk associated with the cartridge business." Sony's Kelly Flock added, "And the CD allows smaller manufacturing runs with very short lead times. ... The CD allows the publisher to take creative content risks—not inventory risk."

=== Storage space ===
Throughout the fifth generation of video game consoles, even during development of Nintendo 64, Nintendo repeatedly revised its estimates of maximum cartridge size: in late 1995, the maximum deliverable cartridge size reportedly had been recently thought to be 64 megabits (8 megabytes), and was then revised to 96 megabits (12 megabytes) with a future theoretical maximum of 256 megabits (32 megabytes). By 1998, the largest Game Paks ever officially made were 512 megabits (64 megabytes), whereas CDs can hold more than 650 megabytes. Storage sizes range from 4 MB (32 Mbit) such as Automobili Lamborghini (1997) and Dr. Mario 64 (2001), to 32 MB (256 Mbit) such as The Legend of Zelda: Ocarina of Time (1998), to 64 MB (512 Mbit) such as Resident Evil 2 (1998) and Conker's Bad Fur Day (2001). Games ported from other platforms may utilise more aggressive data compression (as with Resident Evil 2) or altered content (as with Spider-Man and Mortal Kombat Mythologies: Sub-Zero) so that they may fit on a Game Pak. Exceptionally large games on CD-based systems could span multiple discs totalling in the gigabytes, which would have been prohibitively expensive to distribute across multiple Game Paks. Furthermore, the 64DD expansion with 64 MB floppy disks was released late and discontinued quickly.

Due to the Game Pak's space limitations, full-motion video is not usually feasible for use in cutscenes. A notable exception is Resident Evil 2, which contains the equivalent material of the two CD-ROM discs of the original PlayStation version – albeit compressed – plus some expanded content, higher quality instruments, and surround sound support, and what Eurogamer called "one of the most ambitious [and impressive] console ports of all time". Some games contain cinematic scenes with graphics generated by the system in real-time, like The Legend of Zelda: Ocarina of Time. Nintendo downplayed the importance of prerendered videos, with software engineering manager Jim Merrick saying, "Full-motion video demos [fit] really well on a CD-ROM, but once you get into the software, as a gamer, you're thinking 'let's get on with the game.'"

Nintendo also countered that developers did not generally use the full 650 MiB capacity of CD-ROMs, stating that the smaller storage space encouraged developers to "place a premium on substance over flash".

Another argument in favor of cartridges is that particularly earlier PS1 games mostly used the CD storage for Redbook audio as well as dummy data, with the actual used game data being close to the size of a typical N64 game. Ridge Racer on the PS1 is notable for fitting entirely in the PS1's RAM after loading, with the CD only being used to stream CD audio, also allowing the user to replace it with any other music CD. Furthermore, optical disc based games in general tend to duplicate some data when possible to reduce the amount of travel the laser would have to do at any given time, something that's a non issue on cartridge systems.

=== Copy protection ===
CD-ROMs are known for relative ease of copying on personal computers, whereas Game Paks use Nintendo's proprietary format and are more difficult to bootleg.

I've seen speculation about how [the choice of cartridges] was some plot to control third-party publishers. That's completely nonsense. There is just not a grain of truth in that thing. No discussion like that ever occurred; that was never an issue. It was strictly technology and counterfeiting.

— Howard Lincoln

== Reception ==
=== Critical reception ===
John Ricciardi, writing for Electronic Gaming Monthly, called Nintendo's decision to stick with a cartridge format for the Nintendo 64 "stubborn" and a major contributor to the company's competitive disadvantages. Brian Dipert, writing for EDN Magazine, said that the Nintendo 64 Game Paks are "bulky and expensive, eating into Nintendo's profit margins compared with competitors’ inexpensive CD and DVD plastic discs". On a more positive side, Aaron Curtiss of The Los Angeles Times praised Nintendo's choice of the cartridge medium with its "nonexistent" load times and "continuous, fast-paced action CD-ROMs simply cannot deliver", concluding that "the cartridge-based Nintendo 64 delivers blistering speed and tack-sharp graphics that are unheard of on personal computers and make competing 32-bit, disc-based consoles from Sega [Saturn] and Sony [PlayStation] seem downright sluggish". Describing the quality control incentives associated with cartridge-based development, Curtiss cited Nintendo's position that cartridge game developers tend to "place a premium on substance over flash", and noted that the launch games lack the "poorly acted live-action sequences or half-baked musical overtures" he found on CD-ROM games at the time.

=== Industry reception ===
As part of the controversial technological tradeoffs between storage and performance, which has been endemic to the entire computing industry, and which Nintendo had faced since the Famicom's cassette and floppy disk systems, the selection of a cartridge format for the Nintendo 64 was essential to several developers' projects. However, the choice of a cartridge format, coupled with the commercial failure of the 64DD were also key factors in Nintendo losing both their marketshare and favour with developers.

The Nintendo 64's primary competitors, the Sony PlayStation and the Sega Saturn, use CD-ROMs for game storage. As a result of lower manufacturing costs, quicker pressing, and greater storage, some publishers who had traditionally supported Nintendo's consoles prior to the Nintendo 64 were now producing games primarily or solely for Nintendo's competitors. This includes Square, Capcom, and also Enix, who had initially pre-planned Dragon Warrior VII for the Nintendo 64 and its yet-unreleased 64DD disk drive peripheral at least by 1996, but migrated to the PlayStation due to the developers' increasingly ambitious use of storage space with their fundamentally cinematic game format. Shiny Entertainment had been planning to develop MDK for the Nintendo 64, but switched to PC when they found the cartridge space was insufficient for their plans and Nintendo failed to produce the promised 64DD in a timely manner. In November 1997, Nintendo of America VP George Harrison acknowledged that Square was a "significant" loss, noting the popularity of role-playing games, especially in Japan.

When we discussed designing the field scenes as illustrations or CG based, we came up with the idea to eliminate the connection between movies and the fields. Without using blackout at all, and maintaining quality at the same time, we would make the movie stop at one cut and make the characters move around on it. We tried to make it controllable even during the movies. As a result of using a lot of motion data + CG effects and in still images, it turned out to be a mega capacity game, and therefore we had to choose CD-ROM as our media. [In] other words, we became too aggressive, and got ourselves into trouble.

— Hironobu Sakaguchi, the creator of the Final Fantasy series

Some developers who remained on Nintendo 64 released fewer games for the system. Konami was a major example of this, releasing 29 Nintendo 64 games but more than 50 on the PlayStation. Overall, new game releases were less frequent for the Nintendo 64 than those for the PlayStation.

When interviewed by Computer & Video Games at Shoshinkai 1995, about how the using CDs could have impacted their game development, Rare said that "Blastdozer would require more time and much more RAM", and that "Goldeneye would require twice the RAM". In the 2013 Director's Commentary video about Conker's Bad Fur Day, after observing the imperceptible loading times and the "seamless" transitions between major scenes of the game, Rare programmers said that "the thing about cartridges is … it's solid state ... so it's actually a much more advanced, better medium than discs. You can't have as much [content] on there—or, rather, you can but it's very expensive—but as a medium, cartridge is [vastly] ahead in superiority to any Blu-ray or disc … [or] hard drives."

In November 1997, Star Fox designer Jez San lamented that "Very few third-party developers are actually working with N64", for several major business reasons plus the extra time of optimizing a game for constrained cartridge space. At that time, Nintendo of America VP George Harrison acknowledged the historical problem of price.

After having developed CD-ROM media in two different LucasArts releases for PlayStation, Factor 5's co-founder Julian Eggebrecht said in a February 1998 publication,

We immediately liked the N64 because we didn't have to deal with CDs. You shouldn't underestimate what a battle it can be to make a CD game on the PlayStation. You have to fill it, you have to burn it — which takes an hour every time you want to see a new version of your game, you have to work around loading errors, and so on. CDs can be a real pain.

Eggebrecht identified RAM, not storage, as the key bottleneck for any console; he identified CD-ROM read speeds as exacerbating that bottleneck and favoured cartridges to mitigate it. Speaking on his programmers' optimisations for Indiana Jones and the Infernal Machine, Eggebrecht stated:

The big strength was the N64 cartridge. We use the cartridge almost like normal RAM and are streaming all level data, textures, animations, music, sound and even program code while the game is running. With the final size of the levels and the amount of textures, the [8 megabytes of] RAM of the N64 never would have been even remotely enough to fit any individual level. So the cartridge technology really saved the day.

== See also ==
- Nintendo 64 technical specifications
