= DVD-R DL =

DVD Recordable Dual Layer

DVD-R DL (DL stands for Dual Layer), also called DVD-R9, is a derivative of the DVD-R format standard. DVD-R DL discs hold 8.5 gigabyte (GB) by utilizing two recordable dye layers, each capable of storing a little less than the 4.7 GB of a single layer disc, almost doubling the total disc capacity. Discs can be read in many DVD devices (older units are less compatible) and can only be written using DVD-R DL compatible recorders. It is part of optical disc recording technologies for digital recording to optical disc.

DVD-R DL products started appearing on the market during mid-2004.

== Capacities ==
DVD-R DL	Capacity	
Physical size	Nominal capacity in GB (10^{9} bytes)	Typical capacity in GiB (2^{30} bytes)
12 cm, single sided	8.5	7.96
12 cm, double sided	17.1	15.91
8 cm, single sided	2.65	2.47
8 cm, double sided	5.3	4.94

=== Compatibility ===
DVD-R DL has compatibility issues with legacy DVD-ROM drives known as pickup head overrun. To avoid this issue, the two layers of the disc need to be equally recorded. But this is a contradiction with the sequential nature of the DVD recording. Thus DVD Forum under Pioneer's lead developed a technology known as Layer Jump Recording (LJR), which incrementally record smaller sections of each layer to maintain compatibility with DVD-ROM drives.

According to the developer of dvd+rw-tools, DVD-R DL lacks appendable writing support in the "incremental" recording mode that is normally used for multisession writing on single-layer media, and requires the use of the more complicated "Layer Jump Recording", so multi-session writing is not possible without technical difficulty. Without appendable writing, any space not used during the first write is wasted.

DVD-R DL media has been discontinued by most manufacturers. DVD+R DL is dominating the market for dual layered media.

== Dual layer recording ==
Dual Layer recording allows DVD-R and DVD+R discs to store significantly more data, up to 8.5 GB, per disc, compared with 4.7 GB for single-layer discs. DVD-R DL was developed for the DVD Forum by Pioneer Corporation, DVD+R DL (formally known as Double Layer) was developed for the DVD+RW Alliance by Philips and Mitsubishi Kagaku Media (MKM).

A Dual Layer disc differs from its usual DVD counterpart by employing a second physical layer within the disc itself. The drive with Dual Layer capability accesses the second layer by shining the laser through the first semi-transparent layer. The layer change can exhibit a noticeable pause in some DVD players, up to several seconds. This caused more than a few viewers to worry that their dual layer discs were damaged or defective, with the end result that studios began listing a standard message explaining the dual layer pausing effect on all dual layer disc packaging.

The stacked, shine-through arrangement of layers does come with a small increase in error rate due to reduced reflectivity of the written layers, and a similar small risk of crosstalk interference. One of the techniques employed to help compensate for these reliability shortcomings is a 10% increase in minimum mark (digital 0 or 1) length on the disc, with a corresponding 10% increase in rotation speed and 10% reduction in gross recordable capacity, accounting for the lower capacity of a single-sided dual-layer DVD at 8.5 billion bytes, versus a double-sized, single-layer DVD at 9.4 billion (for 12 cm discs). Detail differences in formatting and file structure mean the "usable" data area capacity does not change by exactly this much, but for all intents a DVD-R DL has effectively 20/11ths the capacity of a DVD-R SL, and the same holds for +R, commercially pressed, and 8 cm discs.

DVD recordable discs supporting this technology are backward compatible with some existing DVD players and DVD-ROM drives. Many current DVD recorders support dual-layer technology, and the price is now comparable to that of single-layer drives, though the blank media remains more expensive. The recording speeds reached by dual-layer media are still well below those of single-layer media.

There are two modes for dual layer orientation. With parallel track path (PTP), used on DVD-ROM, both layers start at the inside diameter (ID) and end at the outside diameter (OD) with the lead-out. With Opposite Track Path (OTP), used on DVD-Video, the lower layer starts at the ID and the upper layer starts at the OD where the first layer ends. The two layers share one lead-in and one lead-out. Only blank disks and drives that support the latter mode are currently available.

== Recordable DVD capacity comparison ==
For comparison, the table below shows storage capacities of the four most common DVD recordable media, excluding DVD-RAM. (SL) stands for standard single-layer discs, while DL denotes the dual-layer variants. See articles on the formats in question for information on compatibility issues.

Disk Type	number of sectors for data (2,048 B each)	capacity in bytes	nominal capacity in GB (10^{9} bytes)
DVD-R (SL)	2,298,496	4,707,319,808	4.7
DVD+R (SL)	2,295,104	4,700,372,992	4.7
DVD-R DL	4,171,712	8,543,666,176	8.5
DVD+R DL	4,173,824	8,547,991,552	8.5

== See also ==
- DVD+R DL
- DVD
- DVD-R
- DVD-RW
- DVD-RW DL
- Book type
- MultiLevel Recording
- List of optical disc manufacturers
