= Nintendo optical discs =

Types of disc used in the GameCube, Wii, and Wii U consoles

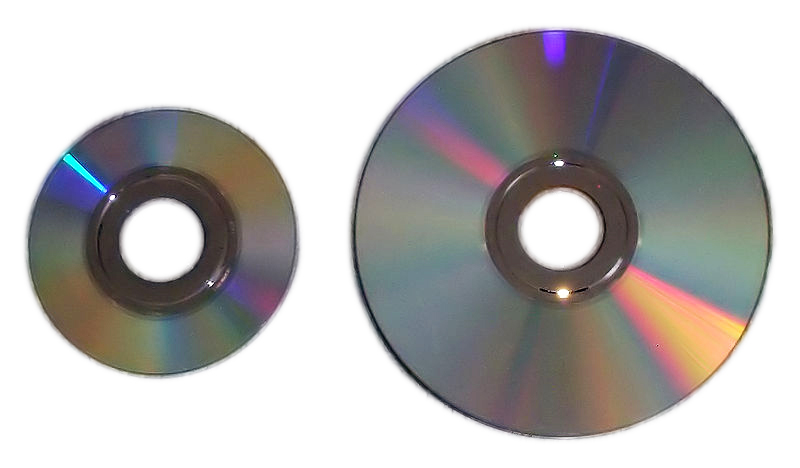
- GameCube Game Disc (left) and Wii Optical Disc (right)
- Media type: Read-only optical disc
- Encoding: Digital
- Capacity: GameCube: 1.46 GB; Wii: 4.7 GB / 8.54 GB; Wii U: 25 GB
- Read mechanism: GameCube and Wii: 650 nm diode laser; Wii U: 405 nm diode laser
- Developed by: Nintendo; Panasonic
- Dimensions: GameCube: 8 cm (3.1 in); Wii and Wii U: 12 cm (4.7 in)
- Usage: GameCube; Wii; Wii U

Nintendo optical discs are physical media used to distribute video games on three of Nintendo's consoles that released between 2001 and 2012. Manufactured and developed by Panasonic, these are the GameCube Game Disc, Wii Optical Disc, and Wii U Optical Disc. Nintendo used disc-based media for physical games after the Nintendo 64's Game Pak and stopped using them starting with the Nintendo Switch's game card.

The physical size of a GameCube Game Disc is that of a miniDVD; Wii Optical Discs are based on DVD format, and Wii U Optical Discs are based on Blu-ray format. To maintain backward compatibility between generations of game consoles, GameCube discs are compatible with the first model of the Wii, and Wii Optical Discs are compatible with the Wii U. A burst cutting area is located at the inner ring of the disc surface.

== Format ==
=== GameCube Game Disc ===
The GameCube Game Disc (DOL-006) is the game medium for the GameCube, created by Matsushita/Panasonic, one of the ten founders of the DVD Forum, and later used on the Wii's first model via backwards compatibility. The GameCube is Nintendo's first optical disc console, after mainly ROM cartridge–based platforms. The GameCube Game Disc is a 1.46 GB, 8 cm miniDVD-based technology. It was chosen by Nintendo to prevent copyright infringement of its games, to reduce manufacturing costs compared to Nintendo 64 Game Paks, and to avoid licensing fees to the DVD Forum. GameCube Game Discs do not use the Content Scramble System found on normal DVD-Video discs, as Nintendo was not satisfied with its level of security.

The GameCube is not able to be used as a general DVD player, except for the Panasonic Q, which is a uniquely customized GameCube with DVD capability that was released only in Japan.

Some GameCube games with large amounts of data span two discs, such as Resident Evil 4, Baten Kaitos, and Tales of Symphonia. Some multi-platform games that fit on single discs for PlayStation 2 and Xbox had certain features removed in order to fit on GameCube Game Discs. This is due to the PS2 and Xbox consoles generally using DVDs for game media instead of the GameCube style disc, with DVDs much higher capacity of 4.7 GB for a single-layer disc and 8.5 GB for a dual-layer disc compared to 1.46 GB capacity for a GameCube disc. Full-motion video (FMV) scenes and audio clips have higher compression or lower quality to fit on a single disc.

=== Wii Optical Disc ===
The Wii Optical Disc (RVL-006) is the physical game medium for the Wii, created by Panasonic. Nintendo extended its proprietary technology to use a full size 12 cm, 4.7/8.54 GB DVD-based disc, retaining the benefits of the GameCube Game Disc, and adding the standard capacity of a double-layer DVD-ROM. Wii Discs always include a partition with files to update the Wii system software, which are installed before starting the game if needed. This ensures that systems that cannot connect to the Internet are still updated. For the same reasons as the GameCube, the Wii cannot play DVD movies or CDs. Earlier Wiis had DVD playing capabilities that was disabled in software, though it can play them using homebrew such as WiiMC.

The Wii can read dual-layer discs, but all games were single-layer prior to the release of Super Smash Bros. Brawl. Upon that release, Nintendo admitted that some Wii systems may have trouble reading dual-layer discs due to a dirty laser lens. Nintendo repaired systems with dual-layer problems, and later released a disc cleaning kit for users to purchase.

=== Wii U Optical Disc ===
The Wii U Optical Disc (WUP-006) is the retail physical game medium for the Wii U, with a capacity of 25 GB. There is no 50 GB dual layer version. The Wii U system software is backwards compatible with Wii Optical Discs, but not with GameCube game discs, while a Wii U disc can physically be inserted into a Wii but cannot be read. The Wii U Optical Discs differ in appearance from most other optical discs in that they have soft, rounded edges.

The console's optical drive was developed and supplied by Panasonic, a founding member in the Blu-ray Disc Association. It is not clear whether the Wii U Optical Disc is similar in physical design to the Blu-ray physical disc specification. Nintendo president Satoru Iwata stated, "Wii U does not have DVD or Blu-ray playback capabilities. The reason for that is that we feel that enough people already have devices that are capable of playing DVDs and Blu-ray, such that it didn't warrant the cost involved to build that functionality into the Wii U console because of the patents related to those technologies". Like with the GameCube and Wii optical discs, it was chosen by Nintendo to prevent copyright infringement of games, to reduce cost by avoiding licensing fees to the Blu-ray Disc Association (BDA), and to reduce loading times. This also prevents the console from being modified into a DVD or Blu-ray movie player.

== Burst cutting area ==
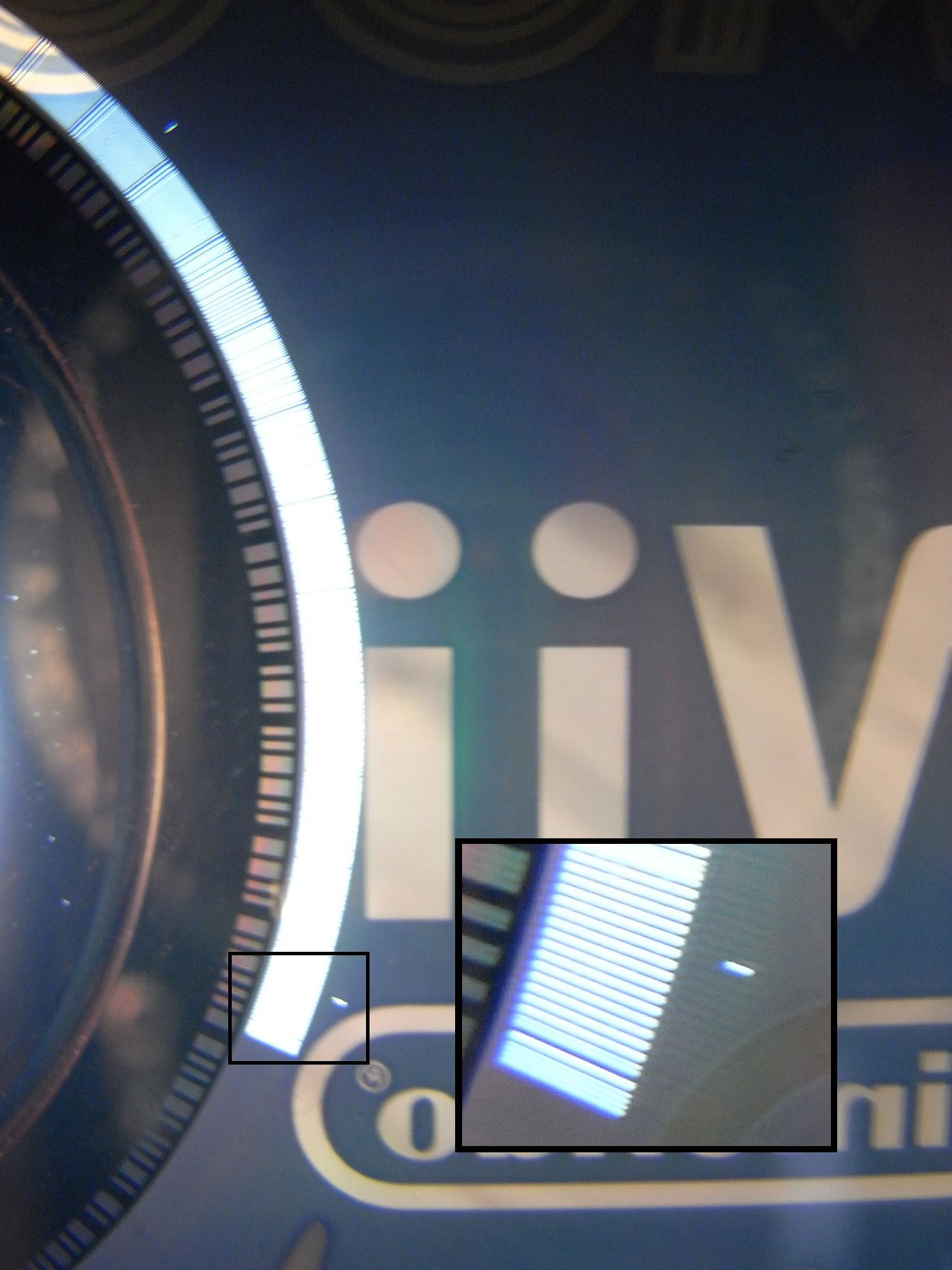
A section of the BCA of a Nintendo Optical Disc with two of the six additional cuts visible

Each Nintendo optical disc contains a burst cutting area (BCA) mark, a type of barcode that is written to the disc with a YAG laser. The data stored in this BCA mark includes an encrypted table related to the hardware-based copy-protection mechanics, in addition to 64 bytes of un-encrypted user-accessible data. Wii U discs do not use BCA.

A BCA mark is visible to the naked eye. It is different from the IFPI mark that is on all optical discs. BCA is described in Annex K of the physical specification, and can be seen between radius 22.3±0.4 mm and 23.5±0.5 mm. There are also six additional evenly spaced small cuts, visible with a strong light source, located just outside the BCA radius, which are related to the copy-protection. Their value as a copy protection mechanism diminished after Datel discovered that the same pattern could be recorded into the DVD instead of needing to be precisely cut later.

New Super Mario Bros. Wii was the first Wii game to use the BCA as part of an anti-piracy check; nonetheless, it was later cracked.

== See also ==
- GD-ROM
