= Book type =

The book type is a field of four bits at the start of every DVD (in the physical format information section of the control data block) that indicates what the physical format of the disc is. Many devices will use this field to determine how the disc should be treated.

One common cause of compatibility problems is the failure of a device to recognize the book type of the disc, most likely because the device had been manufactured before that particular book type was defined; for example, most DVD playback devices made before mid-2004 cannot recognize the relatively new DVD+R DL Book Type. For DVD+R, DVD+RW, and DVD+R DL discs, it is possible to change the book type field value to the value associated with the DVD-ROM format (or in some rare and unorthodox cases, even the value associated with the DVD-R format—though only DVD+R can be changed to this) in order to fool older devices, which is a trick known as bitsetting.

These are the possible values of the Book Type Field:

Value	Meaning
0000	DVD-ROM, either one or two layers
0001	DVD-RAM
0010	DVD-R or DVD-R DL, depending on the Part Version field
0011	DVD-RW
1001	DVD+RW
1010	DVD+R
1101	DVD+RW DL (never released)
1110	DVD+R DL

== See also ==
- Media Identification Code
- Burst cutting area
- Rainbow Books, the other types of books for optical discs
- File format § Magic number
- Wobble frequency
- ROM Mark
