= Game Pak =

Brand name for Nintendo ROM cartridges

- Media type: Flash ROM
- Capacity: NES: 32 KB–1 MB; SNES: 128 KB–4 MB; Nintendo 64: 4–64 MB; Game Boy/Game Boy Color: 32 KB–8 MB; Game Boy Advance: 4–32 MB

Game Pak is the brand name for ROM cartridges designed by Nintendo for some of their earlier video game systems. The "Game Pak" moniker was coined by Nintendo of America's marketing manager Gail Tilden. It was used in North America, Europe, Oceania, and South Korea. In Japan, Nintendo uses the term Cassette (カセット, Kasetto) when referring to Famicom, Super Famicom and Nintendo 64 game paks, and Cartridge (カートリッジ, Kātorijji) for the Game Boy line and Virtual Boy.

Game Paks were used as the primary storage medium for the Nintendo Entertainment System, Super Nintendo Entertainment System, Nintendo 64, and all handhelds using the Game Boy branding. While home consoles GameCube, Wii, and Wii U all used optical media, newer Nintendo consoles offering handheld play—the Nintendo DS, 3DS, Switch, and Switch 2—use Game Cards, which are flatter cartridges.
