= SCSI Multimedia Commands =

Set of commands used for accessing multimedia features

SCSI Multimedia Commands (MMC) is a standard defining a SCSI/ATAPI based command set for accessing and controlling optical disc readers/writers (any device of type 05h). Thus, optical drives for the compact disc, DVD, and Blu-ray disc fall under this specification. The T10 subcommittee is responsible for developing MMC as well as other SCSI command set standards. It was approved in December 1997 by ANSI.

== See also ==
- Mount Rainier (MRW)
- Layer Jump Recording (LJR)
- Optical disc recording modes
- Small Form Factor committee (SFF)
