= DVD recordable =

Recordable optical disk technology

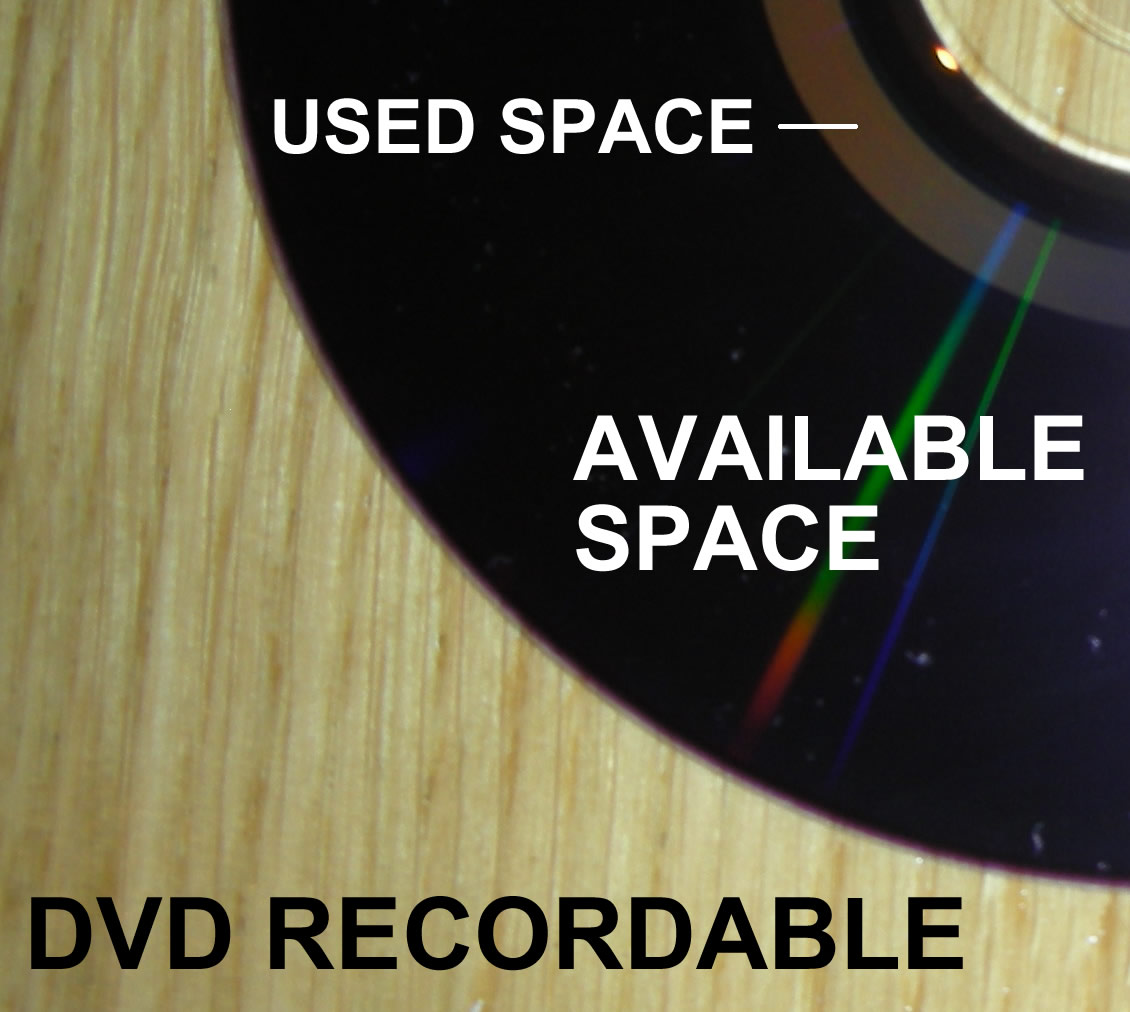
Embedded Data: A DVD-R disc (also applies to DVD+R) which is only partially written to. Data is burned onto the disc with a writing laser.

DVD recordable and DVD rewritable are a collection of optical disc formats that can be written to by a DVD recorder and by computers using a DVD writer. The "recordable" discs are write-once read-many (WORM) media, whereas "rewritable" discs are able to be erased and rewritten. Data is written ("burned") to the disc by a laser, rather than the data being "pressed" onto the disc during manufacture, like a DVD-ROM. Pressing is used in mass production, primarily for the distribution of home video.

DVD±R (also DVD+/-R, or "DVD plus/dash R") is a shorthand term for both DVD+R and DVD-R formats. Likewise, the term DVD±RW refers to both rewritable disc types, the DVD+RW and the DVD-RW. DVD±R/W (also written as, DVD±R/RW, DVD±R/±RW, DVD+/-RW, DVD±R(W) and other arbitrary ways) handles all common writable disc types, but not DVD-RAM. A drive that supports writing to all these disc types including DVD-RAM (but not necessarily including cartridges or 8cm diameter discs) is referred to as a "Multi" recorder.

Like CD-Rs, DVD recordable uses dye to store the data. During the burning of a single bit, the laser's intensity affects the reflective properties of the burned dye. By varying the laser intensity quickly, high density data is written in precise tracks. Since written tracks are made of darkened dye, the data side of a recordable DVD has a distinct color. Burned DVDs have a higher failure-to-read rate than pressed DVDs, due to differences in the reflective properties of dye compared to the aluminum substrate of pressed discs.

== Comparing recordable CDs and DVDs ==
The larger storage capacity of a DVD-R compared to a CD-R is achieved by focusing the laser to a smaller point, creating smaller 'pits' as well as a finer track pitch of the groove spiral which guides the laser beam. These two changes allow more pits to be written in the same physical disc area, giving higher data density. The smaller focus is possible with a shorter wavelength 'red' laser of 650 nm, compared to CD-R's wavelength of 780 nm. This is used in conjunction with a higher numerical aperture lens. The dyes used in each case are different as they are optimized for different wavelengths.

== R and RW formats ==
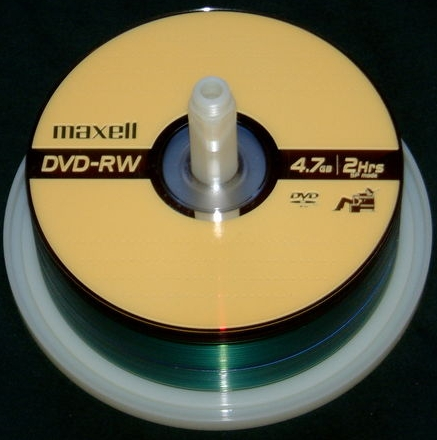
DVD-RW discs on a spindle

"R" format DVDs can be written once and read arbitrarily many times, whereas "RW" formats can be written to repeatedly. Thus, "R" format discs are only suited to non-volatile data storage, such as audio or video. This can cause confusion because the 'DVD+RW Alliance' logo is a stylized 'RW'. Thus, many discs have the RW logo, but are not rewritable.

According to Pioneer, DVD-RW discs may be written to about 1,000 times before needing replacement. RW discs are used to store volatile data, such as when creating backups or collections of files which are subject to change and re-writes. They are also ideal for home DVD video recorders, where it is advantageous to have a rewritable format capable of digital video data speeds, while being removable, small, and relatively inexpensive. Another benefit to using a rewritable disc is if the burning process produces errors or corrupted data, it can simply be written over again to correct the error, or the corrupted data can be erased. This is also useful for testing optical disc authoring software.

== DVD-R and DVD-RW (DVD "dash") ==
The DVD-R format was developed by Pioneer in 1997. It is supported by most normal DVD players and is approved by the DVD Forum. It has broader playback compatibility than DVD+R, especially with much older players. The dash format uses a "land pre-pit" method to provide sector address information.

DVD "minus" R is not correct, according to DVD-R consortium recommendations; it is, in fact, a dash (i.e. DVD "dash" R). DVD-R and DVD+R technologies are not directly compatible, which created a format war in the DVD technology industry. To reconcile the two competing formats, manufacturers created hybrid drives that could read both—most hybrid drives that handle both formats are labeled DVD±R and Super Multi (which includes DVD-RAM support) and are very popular.

=== DVD-RW versions ===
A DVD-RW disc is a rewritable optical disc with equal storage capacity to a DVD-R, typically 4.7 GB (4,700,000,000 bytes). The format was developed by Pioneer in November 1999 and has been approved by the DVD Forum. The smaller Mini DVD-RW holds 1.46 GB, with a diameter of 8 cm.

The data side of a blank DVD-RW

The primary advantage of DVD-RW over DVD-R is the ability to erase and rewrite to a DVD-RW disc. According to Pioneer, DVD-RW discs may be written to about 1,000 times before needing replacement.

There are three revisions of DVD-RW known as Version 1.0 (1999), Version 1.1 (2000) and Version 1.2 (November 2003).

The writing of DVD-RW Version 1.2 is not backwards-compatible with earlier optical drives that have only been adapted to Version 1.1 and Version 1.0.

DVD-RW media exists in the recording speed variants of 1× (discontinued), 2×, 4× and 6×. Higher speed variants, although compatible with lower writing speeds, are written to with the lowest error rate at the rated speed, similarly to CD-RW.

== DVD+R and DVD+RW (DVD "plus") ==
=== History ===
The DVD+R format was developed by a coalition of corporations—now known as the DVD+RW Alliance—in mid-2002, stemming from a research project at Hewlett-Packard Laboratories (a.k.a. HP Labs) that originated in 1996. The project was the brainchild of Josh Hogan, who represented HP and was involved in the negotiations that resulted in the compromise format for DVD-ROM (prerecorded media) between the DVD Forum and the Sony and Philips teams. HP chose to partner with Sony and Philips, who were initially lukewarm to a fully rewritable format. The success of the HP Labs project in proving out the technology convinced Sony and Philips to go ahead with the move.

The issue was drop-in compatibility of a rewritable format with the existing DVD-ROM players. Rewritable media (such as magnetic hard disk drives or rewritable CDs) have edit gaps between sectors, to provide a buffer so that any timing inaccuracies in the write clock would not result in new data accidentally overwriting any of the other sectors. DVD-ROM disks, being mastered with a continuous stream of data, had no need for edit gaps. In fact, makers of pre-recorded DVD media were quite cool to the idea of users being able to use this format for their own recordings. HP saw this as an opportunity to enter the business, but solving the lack of edit gaps was the key problem. In early 1996, HP exited the hard disk drive business, and two HPL engineers, Daniel (Danny) Abramovitch and Terril Hurst, were moved onto the rewritable DVD project. Abramovitch was (and is) a servo engineer with an interest in timing loops (a.k.a. phase-locked loops). Reading about the wobble grooves on older optical disk formats, Abramovitch proposed that a wobble frequency at roughly the same frequency as the data frequency would provide enough timing accuracy (i.e. allow us to lock a phase-locked loop with small enough jitter) so as to provide sub-bit accuracy on the timing. In a servo systems parlance, this was a high frequency, high-fidelity reference signal for the timing servo loop to follow. Essentially, it would be possible to turn a tracking loop sideways and use all the tools of control theory to improve the timing. The issue was that it was not clear that such a signal would not affect the data itself. It was an insight by David (Dave) Towner, an optical engineer attached to the project, that the detection modes for the wobble and the data (how they added or differenced the regions on the optical detector), would themselves provide enough common mode rejection to separate the signals. At this point, the notion of high frequency wobbles was born. Much of the team's effort after that was to prove out this concept, which led to the fundamental patent for the format by Abramovitch and Towner (US Patent # 6046968, filed July 24, 1997, issued April 4, 2000), entitled Re-Writable Optical Disk Having Reference Clock Information Permanently Formed on the Disk. By late 1998, through the monthly meetings led by project leader Carl Taussig and often accompanied by Josh Hogan, Sony and Philips had warmed to the idea of the format.

In 1999, the team had argued to then HP CEO Lew Platt that HP needed to produce products in the set-top market, the computer market, and the camcorder market to truly exploit the invention. Platt, who had a reputation of being risk averse, chose to stick with only the computer drive product scheduled for development at the Boise facility. In 2000, HP was under the direction of new CEO Carly Fiorina, and the division, under new cost constraints, chose to abandon the manufacture of any new optical drives. However, since HP owned the fundamental patent above, they could receive licensing fees for the patent itself and pursued several expansions of the patent in US Patent # 7701836 (Issued April 20, 2010). There was also US Patent # RE41881 (Reissued October 26, 2010), a reissue of US Patent # 6046968 with expanded claims. Finally, there was US Patent # RE43788 (Issued November 6, 2012), a second reissue of Patent # 6046968 with more claims.

With the timing issue solved by high frequency wobbles, the other key issue solved by the HPL team (through the efforts of Terril Hurst and Craig Perlov) was writing bits in a way that would not result in a bleeding of one bit into the next one. Because DVD+RW used phase-change media, this was solved by high speed modulation of short laser pulses to take advantage of the nonlinear heating and cooling properties of the material and control the pulse shapes. Several papers describing these efforts can be found at:

The DVD Forum initially did not approve of the DVD+R format and claimed that the DVD+R format was not an official DVD format until January 25, 2008.

On 25 January 2008, DVD6C officially accepted DVD+R and DVD+RW by adding them to its list of licensable DVD products.

=== Features ===
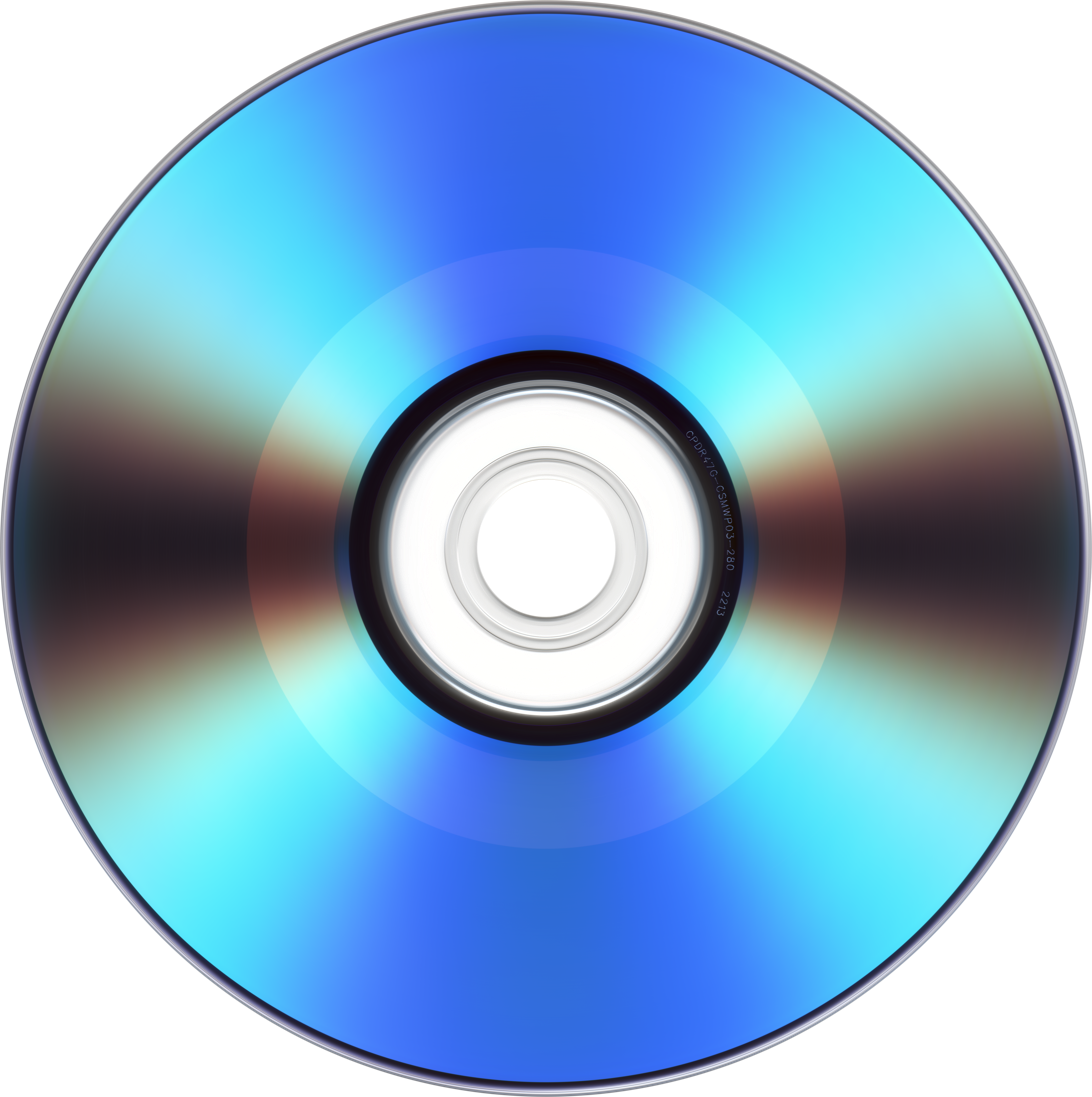
The data side of a blank DVD+R

DVD+RW supports a method of writing called "lossless linking", which makes it suitable for random access and improves compatibility with DVD players. The rewritable DVD+RW standard was formalized earlier than the non-rewritable DVD+R (the opposite was true with the DVD- formats). Although credit for developing the standard is often attributed to Philips, the fundamental work was done by a team at Hewlett-Packard Labs (HPL). It was "finalized" in 1997 by the DVD+RW Alliance once the fundamental patent (US Patent # 6046968) had been filed by the HPL team. It was then abandoned until 2001, when it was heavily revised (in particular, the capacity increased from 2.8 GB to 4.7 GB).

The simulated recording mode feature is no longer an official part of the standard like it was for CD-R, CD-RW, DVD-R and DVD-RW, although supported by Plextor optical drives.

Another distinction in comparison to DVD-R/RW/R DL is that the recorder information (optical drive model) is not written automatically to DVD+ discs by the drive. Nero DiscSpeed allows proprietarily adding such information for later retrieval.

Other changes include the removal of a dedicated SCSI erase command in optical drives, which is done by the software instead that overwrites data with null characters. This means that the standard does not allow reverting the disc to a blank (unwritten) state after the first write.

DVD+RW DL was once developed and announced by JVC but it was never sold due to issues with its low reflectivity (Dual layer).

As of 2006, the market for recordable DVD technology showed little sign of settling down in favour of either the "plus" or "dash" formats, which is mostly the result of the increasing numbers of dual-format devices that can record to both formats, known as DVD Multi Recorders. It has become very difficult to find new computer drives that can only record to one of the formats. By contrast, DVD Video recorders still favour one format over the other, often providing restrictions on what the unfavoured format will do. However, because the DVD-R format has been in use since 1997, it has had a five-year lead on DVD+R. As such, older or cheaper DVD players (up to 2004 vintage) are more likely to favour the DVD-R standard exclusively.

DVD+R discs must be formatted before being recorded by a compatible DVD video recorder. DVD-R do not have to be formatted before being recorded by a compatible DVD video recorder,because the two variants of the discs are written in different formats.

There are a number of significant technical differences between the "dash" and the "plus" format, although most users would not notice the difference. One example is that the DVD+R style address in pregroove (ADIP) system of tracking and speed control is less susceptible to interference and error, which makes the ADIP system more accurate at higher speeds than the land pre pit (LPP) system used by DVD-R. In addition, DVD+R(W) has a more robust error-management system than DVD-R(W), allowing for more accurate burning to media, independent of the quality of the media. The practical upshot is that a DVD+R writer is able to locate data on the disc to byte accuracy whereas DVD-R is incapable of such precision.

DVD+R also has a larger Power Calibration Area (PCA). The PCA in DVD+R has a length of 32768 sectors, compared to the 7088 of DVD-R. In the PCA, which is located close to the inner edge of the disc, a 15-step procedure is carried out to calibrate (vary the power of) the disc drive's laser before every and during writing, to allow for small differences between discs and drives. This process is known as a power test. Calibration during writing allows for small changes in quality between different sections of the disc, such as slightly different optical properties, impurities or dye layer thickness in either the plastic or dye. The results of the power tests are stored in a Recording Management Area (RMA), which can hold up to 7,088 calibrations (in DVD-R). The disc can not be written to after the RMA becomes full, although it may be emptied in RW discs. CD-R, CD-RW, DVD-R, DVD+R, DVD-R DL, DVD+R DL, and DVD+RW all have a PCA. CDs (and possibly DVDs) may also have two PCAs: one on the inner edge of the disc, for low speed testing, and another on the outer edge for high speed testing.

Additional session linking methods are more accurate with DVD+R(W) versus DVD-R(W), resulting in fewer damaged or unusable discs due to buffer under-run and multi-session discs with fewer PI/PO errors.

Like other "plus" media, it is possible to change the book type to increase the compatibility of DVD+R media (though unlike DVD+RW, it is a one way process). This is also known as bitsetting.

==== Wobble frequency ====
Developed by HP in collaboration with Philips and Sony and their DVD+RW Alliance, the "plus" format uses a more reliable bi-phase modulation technique to provide "sector" address information. It was introduced after the "-" format.

The wobble frequency has been increased from 140.6 kHz to 817.4 kHz.

==== Transfer rates ====
Like DVD-R (single-layer), DVD+R (single-layer) media officially exists with rated recording speeds of up to 16× (constant angular velocity). However, on both +R and -R types, some models of half-height (desktop) optical drives allow bypassing the rating and recording at speeds beyond 16× on selected recordable media by vendors considered of high quality, including Verbatim and Taiyo Yuden.

On dual-layer media, half-height optical drives released towards 2010, such as the 2007 TSSTcorp TS-H653B, have adapted recording speeds of up to 16× on DVD+R DL media by selected vendors, compared to up to 12× on DVD-R DL. More recent optical drives have reduced their maximum allowable recording speed on both +R DL and -R DL media to 8×, usually P-CAV.

DVD+RW media exists with the writing speed ratings of 1×-4× and 2.4×-8×.

Reading speeds (constant angular velocity) on most half-height optical drives released since the mid-2000s decade are up to 16× on DVD±R (single-layer) and 12× on DVD±R DL and DVD±RW.

All constant linear velocity transfer rates (read and write) of 2.0× on DVD-R/RW have been replaced with 2.4× in the specification for DVD+R/RW. Thus, specification sheets of optical drives list "2.4× CLV" instead of "2× CLV" as the base transfer rate level for DVD+R/RW. Earlier optical drives also have a 1.0× transfer rate level for both DVD-R/RW and DVD+R/RW.

==== Random writing ====
DVD+RW discs can be written randomly in any location that has been sequentially written to before at least once.

If a packet writing-enabled Universal Disk Format (UDF) is mounted, the operating system may perform a "background formatting" while the disc is not in use (meaning not being read or written to), which sequentially fills never-written parts of the disc with blank data to make them able to be written to randomly.

== DVD-RAM ==
As RAM stands for Random Access Memory, it works more or less like a hard-drive and was designed for corporate back-up use. Developed in 1996, DVD-RAM is a rewritable optical disc originally encased in a cartridge. Currently available in standard 4.7 GB (and sometimes in other sizes), it is useful in applications that require quick revisions and rewriting. It can only be read in drives that are DVD-RAM compatible, which all multi-format drives are. DVD Forum backs this format. It uses physical dedicated sector markers (visible as rectangles on the read side of the disc) instead of the pre-pits or wobbles used in other types of recordable and rewritable media.

Multi-format drives can read and write more than one format; e.g. DVD±R(W) (DVD plus-dash recordable and rewritable) is used to refer to drives that can write/rewrite both plus and dash formats, but not necessarily DVD-RAM. Drives marked "DVD Multi Recorder" support DVD±R(W) and DVD-RAM.

The "RAM" from DVD-RAM is not related to the random-access memory in which a computer stores opened programs.

== Sizes ==
DVD recordable media are sold in two standard sizes, a regular 12 cm (5 in) size for home recording and computer usage, and a small 8 cm (3 in) size (sometimes known as a miniDVD) for use in compact camcorders. The smaller Mini DVD-RW, for example, holds 1.46 GB.

== Speed ==
Drive speed	Data rate		Disc write time	Equivalent CD rate	Reading speed
1×	11.08 Mbit/s	1.385 MB/s	53 min	9×	8×–18×
2×	22.16 Mbit/s	2.770 MB/s	27 min	18×	20×–24×
4×	44.32 Mbit/s	5.540 MB/s	14 min	36×	24×–32×
5×	55.40 Mbit/s	6.925 MB/s	11 min	45×	24×–32×
6×	66.48 Mbit/s	8.310 MB/s	9 min	54×	24×–32×
8×	88.64 Mbit/s	11.080 MB/s	7 min	72×	32×–40×
10×	110.80 Mbit/s	13.850 MB/s	6 min	90×	32×–40×
16×	177.28 Mbit/s	22.160 MB/s	4 min	144×	32×–40×
18×	199.44 Mbit/s	24.930 MB/s	3 min	162×	32×–40×
20×	221.60 Mbit/s	27.700 MB/s	2 min	180×	32×–40×
24×	265.92 Mbit/s	33.240 MB/s	2 min	216×	32×–48×

Notes:

- The rotation speed of DVD at ×1 CAV (~580 rpm) is around three times as high as CD at ×1 (~200 rpm)
- Disc write time in table does not include overhead, leadout, etc.

The following table describes the maximal speed of DVD-R and the relative typical write time for a full disc according to the reviews from cdrinfo.com and cdfreaks.com. Many reviews of multiple brand names on varying conditions of hardware and DVD give much lower and wider measurements than the optimal numbers below.

The write time may vary (± 30 s) between writer and media used. For high speed, the write strategy changes from constant linear velocity (CLV) to constant angular velocity (CAV), or zoned constant linear velocity (ZCLV). The table below largely assumes CAV.

Drive speed	Data rate (MB/s)	Data rate (Mbit/s)	Write time for single-layer DVD-R
1×	1.32	10.56	1 hour
2×	2.64	21.12	30 minutes (CLV)
4×	5.28	42.24	15 minutes (CLV)
8×	10.56	84.48	8 minutes (ZCLV)
16×	21.12	168.96	5 min 45 sec (CAV)
18×	23.76	190.08	5 min 30 sec (CAV)
20×	26.40	211.20	5 minutes (CAV)
22×	29.04	232.32	4 min 30 sec (CAV)
24×	31.68	253.44	~4 minutes (CAV)

=== Adoption ===
Some half-height DVD Multi Recorder drives released since 2007, such as the TSSTcorp SH-S203/TS-H653B (2007) have officially adapted support for writing speeds of up to 12× on DVD-R DL and 16× on DVD+R DL (on recordable media by selected vendors only), while more recent DVD writers such as the SH-224DB (2013) and Blu-ray writers such as the LG BE16NU50 (2016) have restricted the supported DVD±R DL writing speed to 8×.

== Capacities ==
Most DVD±R/RWs are advertised using the definition of 1 gigabyte = 1 GB = 1,000,000,000 bytes. This can be confusing for many users since a 4.7 GB (4.7 billion bytes) DVD that is advertised as such might show up on their device as having 4.38 GiB (depending on what type of prefixes their device uses).

Format	Decimal Capacity	Binary Capacity
DVD±R	4.70 GB	4.38 GiB
DVD±RW	4.70 GB	4.38 GiB
DVD±R DL	8.55 GB	8.15 GiB
DVD-RAM	4.70 GB	4.38 GiB
MiniDVD	1.46 GB	1.39 GiB
MiniDVD DL	2.66 GB	2.54 GiB

== Quality and longevity ==
According to a study published in 2008 by the Preservation Research and Testing Division of the U.S. Library of Congress, most recordable CD products have a higher probability of greater longevity compared to recordable DVD products. A series of follow-up studies conducted by the Canadian Conservation Institute in 2019 revealed that CD-R with phthalocyanine-dye and a gold-metal layer had the greatest longevity at over 100 years when stored at ideal temperature and humidity-levels. The second longest was DVD-R (gold-metal layer) with an average longevity of 50-100 years under ideal conditions. CD-R with phthalocyanine and a silver-metal-alloy layer also scored an average longevity of 50-100 years, however, the researchers noted that if the storage environment contains pollutants any CD-Rs that used a silver layer would likely degrade faster than discs with a gold layer. The researchers concluded the silver layer discs may not be a suitable solution for applications where longevity is important. Both CD-R and DVD-R outperformed all forms of Blu-ray disc in regards to longevity: the best performing Blu-ray disc, the BD-RE (rewritable Blu-ray) has an average longevity of 20-50 years, while non-rewritable BD-R discs have an average longevity of 10-20 years under ideal conditions.

Media of higher quality tends to last longer. Using surface error scanning, the rate of correctable errors can be measured. A higher rate of errors indicates media of lower quality and/or deteriorating media. It may also indicate scratches and/or data written by a defective optical drive.

Not all optical drive models are able to scan the disc quality.

== Disc structure ==
=== R format ===
DVD-R discs are composed of two 0.6 mm acrylic discs, bonded with an adhesive to each other. One contains the laser guiding groove and is coated with the recording dye and a silver alloy or gold reflector. The other one (for single-sided discs) is an ungrooved "dummy" disc to assure mechanical stability of the sandwich structure, and compatibility with the compact disc standard geometry which requires a total disc thickness of about 1.2 mm. The sandwich structure also helps protect the layer containing data from scratches with a thick "dummy" disc, a problem with CDs, which lack that structure. Double-sided discs have two grooved, recordable disc sides, and require the user to flip the disc to access the other side. Compared to a CD's 1.2 mm thickness, a DVD's laser beam only has to penetrate 0.6 mm of plastic in order to reach the dye recording layer, which allows the lens to focus the beam to a smaller spot size to write smaller pits.

In a DVD-R, the addressing (the determination of location of the laser beam on the disc) is done with additional pits and lands (called land pre-pits) in the areas between the grooves. The groove on a DVD-R disc has a constant wobble frequency of 140.6 kHz used for motor control, etc.

In 2011, JVC announced an archival DVD recording medium manufactured with quality control and inspection frequencies techniques greater than is traditionally used in media manufacturing, and using specially developed silver alloy as a reflective layer and organic dye with in-house developed additives to secure long-term data retention.

=== RW format ===
The recording layer in DVD-RW and DVD+RW is not an organic dye, but a special phase change metal alloy, often GeSbTe. The alloy can be switched back and forth between a crystalline phase and an amorphous phase, changing the reflectivity, depending on the power of the laser beam. Data can thus be written, erased and re-written.

== Dual layer ==
In October 2003, it was demonstrated that double layer technology could be used with a DVD+R disc to nearly double the capacity to 8.5 GB per disc. At around that time, similar dual-layer technology was in development for the DVD-R format. The dual layer version of DVD-R, DVD-R DL, appeared on the market in 2005.

A specification for dual-layer DVD-RW discs with a capacity of 8.5 GB (8,500,000,000 bytes) was approved by the DVD Forum, and JVC announced their development of the first media in the format in 2005. A double-layer DVD+RW specification was approved in March 2006 with a capacity of 8.5 GB. However, manufacturing support for these rewritable dual-layer discs did not materialize due to costs and expected competition from newer and higher-capacity formats like Blu-ray and HD DVD.

== See also ==
- DVD
- DVD recorder (DVDR)
- DVD-R DL
- CD-R
- DVD+R DL
- DVD+RW DL
- DVD-RAM
- MiniDVD
- MultiLevel Recording, an obsolete technology (with non-binary modulation)
- Blu-ray Disc
- Blu-ray Disc recordable
- List of DVD recordable manufacturers

== Bibliography ==
- Bennett, Hugh (July 1998), "In DVD's Own Image: DVD-R Technology and Promise", EMedia Professional, pp. 30+.
- ——— (Apr 2004), Understanding Recordable & Rewritable DVD, Cupertino: Optical Storage Technology Association.
- ISO/IEC 17341:2009, Data interchange on 120 mm and 80 mm optical disk using +RW format -- Capacity: 4,7 Gbytes and 1,46 Gbytes per side (recording speed up to 4X)
- ISO/IEC 26925:2009, Data interchange on 120 mm and 80 mm optical disk using +RW HS format -- Capacity: 4,7 Gbytes and 1,46 Gbytes per side (recording speed 8X)
- ISO/IEC 29642:2009, Data interchange on 120 mm and 80 mm optical disk using +RW DL format -- Capacity: 8,55 Gbytes and 2,66 Gbytes per side (recording speed 2,4X)
