= DVD+RW Alliance =

Association that developed the DVD+ formats

- Formation: 1997
- Website: dvdrw.com at the Wayback Machine (archived 2010-03-05)

The DVD+RW Alliance is a group of electronic hardware, optical storage and software manufacturers who in 1997 created and promoted a format standard of recordable and rewritable DVDs, known as the "plus" format. As of 2004, plus format DVDs were available in three forms: DVD+R, DVD+RW, and DVD+R DL. In late 2005 DVD+RW DL was developed but never produced commercially.

== Working groups ==
The Alliance has two major working groups. The DVD+RW Product Promotions Group is responsible for the promotion work of the Alliance for the plus format and plus format products. The DVD+RW Compatibility and Convergence Group is responsible for working on the technical issues involved in the compatibility between the various hardware products using the plus format.

== Leading members ==
Eight companies form the leadership of the alliance:

- Dell
- Hewlett-Packard
- Mitsubishi Chemical
- Philips
- Ricoh
- Sony
- Vantiva
- Yamaha Corporation

The above-mentioned companies are only the leadership of the alliance and don't form the whole alliance itself.

== Rival formats ==
Competing standards developed by the rival DVD Forum are for the "dash" formats (DVD-R, DVD-RW, and DVD-RAM). Alliance leaders Philips, Sony and Thomson were also founding members of the DVD Forum, established in 1995. As of 2009, both plus and dash formats seem equally popular with customers, and both are compatible with the vast majority of DVD players.
