= MiniDVD =

8-centimeter DVD disc

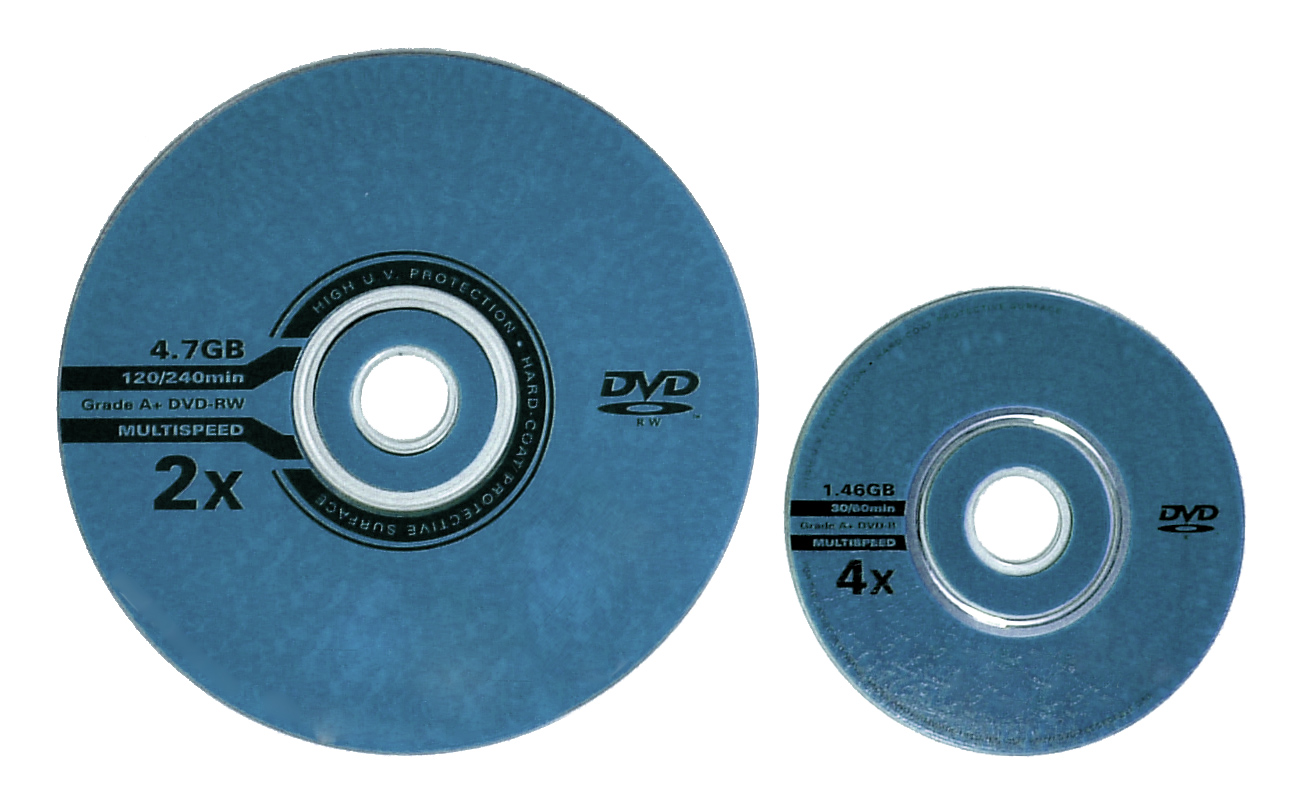
Conventional 12 cm disc (left) compared to 8 cm disc (right)

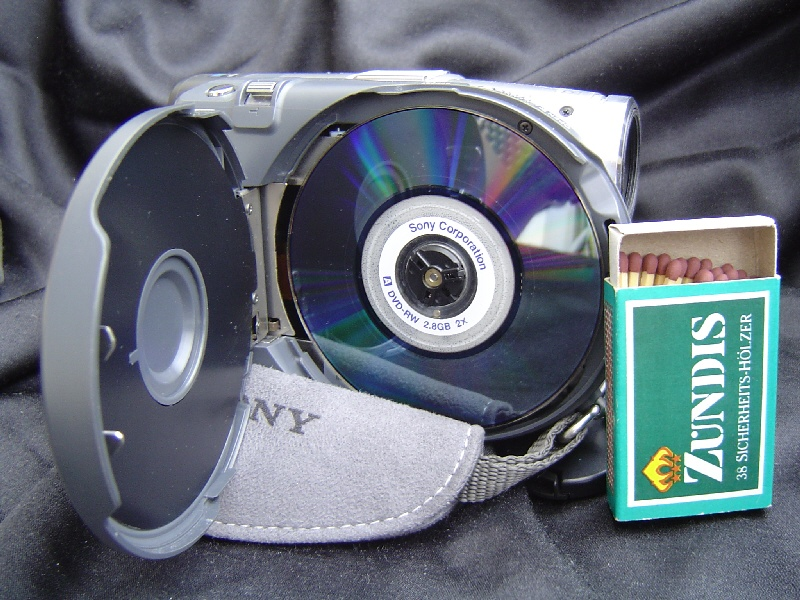
A Sony camcorder using MiniDVD media

MiniDVD or 8 cm DVD (also "3 inch DVD") is a DVD disc with a reduced diameter of 8 centimetres (3.15 in). It has been most commonly used in camcorders due to its compact size. The most common MiniDVDs are single layered and hold 1.4 GB of data, but there are variants that can offer up to 5.2 GB of storage space, through a combination of dual layers and dual sides.

8 cm DVDs were originally used for music videos and as such became known as DVD single, similarly to how 8 cm optical discs were previously used for music singles on compact discs (i.e. CD single and miniCD). However the MiniDVD format has been mostly used as recordable discs in DVD-based camcorders during the 2000s; a single layer disc can record up to 30 minutes of standard definition video. A number of movies and TV shows have also been released on the format in the mid-2000s, usually targeting children using low-cost small players.

Nintendo used a very similar disc-based format for the GameCube.

== MiniDVD capacities ==
The most common MiniDVDs are single layered, which can hold 1.46 GB of data, however, there also exists dual layered 2.6 GB versions, dual sided single layer 2.8 GB versions, and dual sided dual layer 5.2 GB versions. A double sided MiniDVD can hold 2.8 GB of data (1.4 GB x 2), however, a dual-layer MiniDVD can only hold 2.6 GB of data due to the limitations when manufacturing dual layered discs. A double sided dual layered disc can hold 5.2 GB of data (2.6 GB x 2), with the MiniDVD-RAM version of the double sided, dual layer disc being able to hold 5.6 GB of data (2.8GB x 2).

Mini DVDs are also available in +R, +R DS, +R DL, +R DL DS, +RW, +RW DS, -R, -R DS, -R DL, -R DL DS, -RW, and -RW DS variants, just like their full sized counterparts. (DL=Double Layer, DS=Double Sided).

Comparison of 8 cm (MiniDVD) capacities with 12 cm (standard DVD)
Physical size	Single layer capacity	Dual/Double layer capacity
8 cm, single sided	1.46 GB	2.66 GB
8 cm, double sided	2.92 GB	5.32 GB
12 cm, single sided	4.7 GB	8.5 GB
12 cm, double sided	9.4 GB	17.0 GB

== See also ==
- Blu-ray Disc
  - Mini Blu-ray
- CD Video
- DVD
- DVD card
- HD DVD
- LaserDisc
- Nintendo optical discs
- GD-ROM
- Universal Media Disc (UMD)
- Video CD (VCD)
- VideoNow
