= DVD Forum =

Industry association that developed the DVD format

- Formerly: DVD Consortium (1995–1996)
- Founded: 1995; 31 years ago (as DVD Consortium); 1996; 30 years ago (as DVD Forum)
- Defunct: January 31, 2025; 18 months ago
- Fate: Dissolved
- Website: dvdforum.org at the Wayback Machine (archived 2023-03-29)

The DVD Forum (initially DVD Consortium) was an industry consortium created to facilitate the exchange of information and ideas about the DVD format and its specifications from 1995 to 2025.

== History ==
The founding companies were Hitachi, Matsushita Electric Industrial Co, Mitsubishi Electric Corporation, Pioneer, Philips, Sony, Thomson (RCA, Grass Valley, Technicolor), Time Warner, Toshiba and Victor Company of Japan (JVC)

The DVD Forum was created to facilitate the exchange of information and ideas about the DVD format, another evolution of the LaserDisc format, and to enable it to grow through technical improvement and innovation. The organization hoped to promote worldwide acceptance of DVD for entertainment, consumer electronics and information technology applications. Membership in the DVD Forum was open to any company or organization involved in DVD research, development, or manufacturing; software firms and other DVD users interested in developing the format were also encouraged to join. Forum members could support other formats in addition to DVD.

The DVD Forum was responsible for the official DVD format specification. The group handled licensing of the DVD format and logo through the DVD Format and Logo Licensing Corporation (DVD FLLC), which also published the official "DVD Book" format specifications. Reference materials and newsletters were published for DVD Forum members.

In 2003, the DVD Forum had 213 members. In 2007, it had 195 registered members. In 2008, it had 159 registered members, and in 2010, it had 98 registered members. In 2012 this downward trend continued with the membership standing at 80 members. From 1 April 2012, the Forum operated in a "Reduced Activity Mode"; however, the DVD FLLC was still active in 2020. In October 2024, the DVD FLLC announced the deactivation of its website and confirmed that they were "preparing the scheme that enables any Licensees to manufacture DVD products without 'License' on and after January 1, 2025."

In January 2025, the DVD FLLC announced its own dissolution on January 31, 2025 (together with the DVD Forum itself, according to its charter) and the deposit of the DVD Specifications at the National Diet Library of Japan.

As of August 2025, the specification documents are only available at the National Diet Library in Tokyo.

== Related standards ==
Competing standards developed by the rival DVD+RW Alliance are for the "plus" formats (DVD+R, DVD+RW). Alliance leaders Philips, Sony and Thomson were also founding members of the DVD Forum, established in 1997. As of 2009, both plus and dash formats seem equally popular with customers, and both are compatible with the vast majority of DVD players.

== See also ==
- DVD Copy Control Association
- DVD+RW Alliance
- Blu-ray Disc Association
- High-definition optical disc format war
