= DVD =

Digital optical disc data storage format

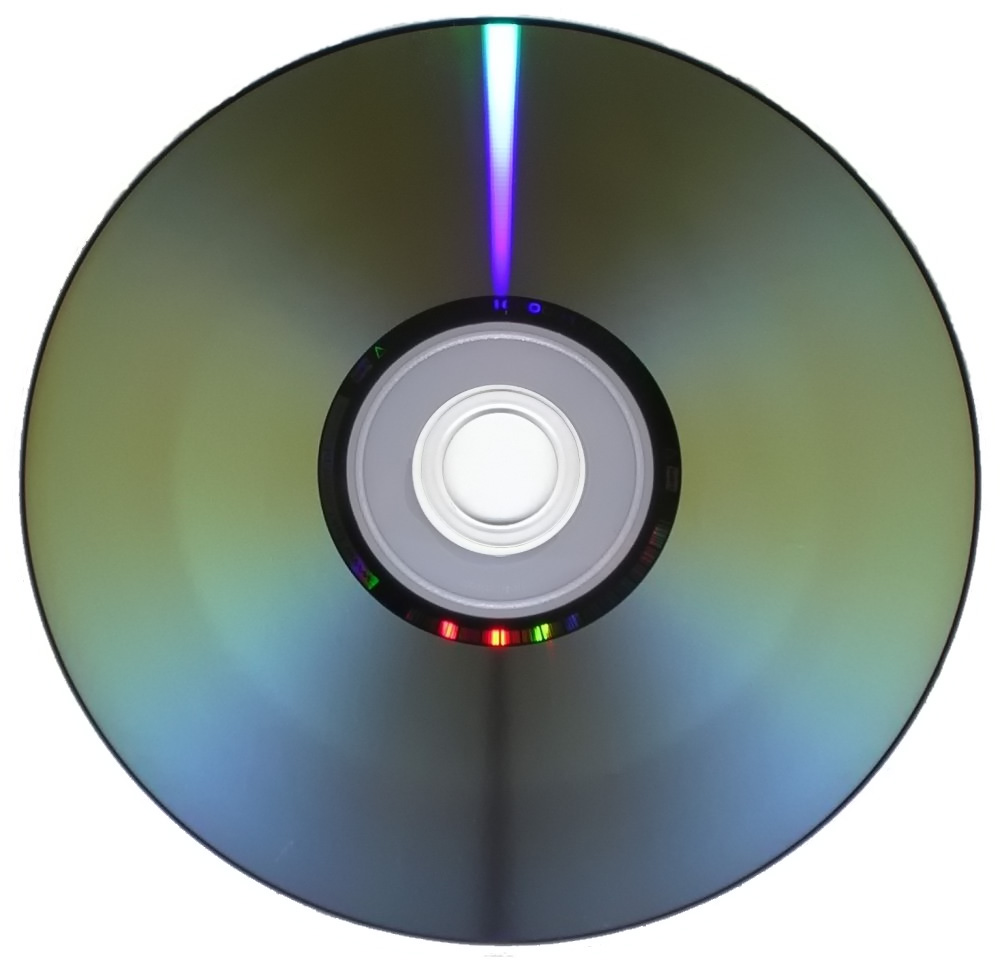
- The data side of a DVD manufactured by Sony DADC
- Media type: Optical disc
- Capacity: 4.7 GB (1 side, 1 layer); 8.5 GB (1 side, 2 layers); 9.4 GB (2 sides, 1 layer); 17.08 GB (2 sides, 2 layers)
- Read mechanism: 650 nm laser diode, 10.5 Mbit/s (1×)
- Write mechanism: 650 nm laser diode, 10.5 Mbit/s (1×)
- Standard: DVD Forum's DVD Books; DVD+RW Alliance specifications
- Developed by: Sony; Panasonic; Philips; Toshiba
- Dimensions: Diameter: 120 mm (4.7 in); Thickness: 1.2 mm (0.047 in)
- Weight: 16 g (0.56 oz)
- Usage: Home video, Computer data storage
- Extended from: LaserDisc; Compact disc
- Extended to: DVD+RW; DVD-RAM; HD DVD; Blu-ray
- Released: JP: November 1, 1996; Asia/CIS: January 1997; US: March 24, 1997; UK: June 1997; EU: March 1998; AUS/NZ: February 1999

DVD (Digital Video Disc or Digital Versatile Disc) is a digital optical disc data storage format. It was invented and developed in 1995 and first released on November 1, 1996, in Japan. The medium can store any kind of digital data and has been widely used to store video programs (watched using DVD players), software and other computer files. DVDs offer significantly higher storage capacity than compact discs (CD) while having the same dimensions. A standard single-layer DVD can store up to 4.7 GB of data, a dual-layer DVD up to 8.5 GB. Dual-layer, double-sided DVDs can store up to a maximum of 17.08 GB.

Prerecorded DVDs are mass-produced using molding machines that physically stamp data onto the DVD. Such discs are a form of DVD-ROM because data can only be read and not written or erased. Blank recordable DVD discs (DVD-R and DVD+R) can be recorded once using a DVD recorder and then function as a DVD-ROM. Rewritable DVDs (DVD-RW, DVD+RW, and DVD-RAM) can be recorded and erased many times.

DVDs are used in DVD-Video consumer digital video format and less commonly in DVD-Audio consumer digital audio format, as well as for authoring DVD discs written in a special AVCHD format to hold high definition material (often in conjunction with AVCHD format camcorders). DVDs containing other types of information may be referred to as DVD data discs.

== Etymology ==
The Oxford English Dictionary comments that, "In 1995, rival manufacturers of the product initially named digital video disc agreed that, in order to emphasize the flexibility of the format for multimedia applications, the preferred abbreviation DVD would be understood to denote digital versatile disc." The OED also states that in 1995, "The companies said the official name of the format will simply be DVD. Toshiba had been using the name 'digital video disc', but that was switched to 'digital versatile disc' after computer companies complained that it left out their applications."

"Digital versatile disc" is the explanation provided in a DVD Forum Primer from 2000 and in the DVD Forum's mission statement, which the purpose is to promote broad acceptance of DVD products on technology, across entertainment, and other industries.

Because DVDs became highly popular for the distribution of movies in the 2000s, the term DVD became popularly used in English as a noun to describe specifically a full-length movie released on the format; for example the phrase "to watch a DVD" describes watching a movie on DVD.

== History ==
=== Development and launch ===
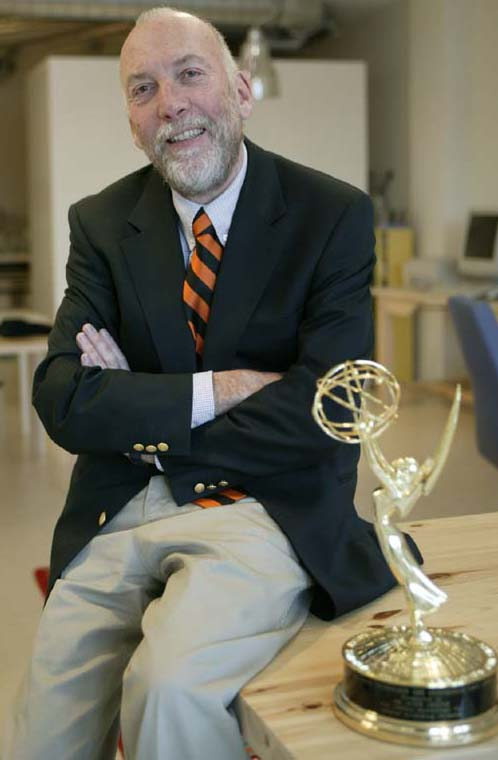
Kees Schouhamer Immink received a personal technical Emmy award for his contributions to DVD and Blu-ray disc.

Released in 1987, CD Video used analog video encoding on optical discs matching the established standard 120 mm (4.7 in) size of audio CDs. Video CD (VCD) became one of the first formats for distributing digitally encoded films in this format, in 1993. In the same year, two new optical disc storage formats were being developed. One was the Multimedia Compact Disc (MMCD), backed by Philips and Sony (developers of the CD and CD-i), and the other was the Super Density (SD) disc, supported by Toshiba, Time Warner, Matsushita Electric, Hitachi, Mitsubishi Electric, Pioneer, Thomson, and JVC. By the time of the press launches for both formats in January 1995, the MMCD nomenclature had been dropped, and Philips and Sony were referring to their format as Digital Video Disc (DVD).

On May 3, 1995, an ad hoc industry technical group formed from five computer companies (IBM, Apple, Compaq, Hewlett-Packard, and Microsoft) issued a press release stating that they would only accept a single format. The group voted to boycott both formats unless the two camps agreed on a single, converged standard. They recruited Lou Gerstner, president of IBM, to pressure the executives of the warring factions. In one significant compromise, the MMCD and SD groups agreed to adopt proposal SD 9, which specified that both layers of the dual-layered disc be read from the same side—instead of proposal SD 10, which would have created a two-sided disc that users would have to turn over. Philips/Sony strongly insisted on the source code, EFMPlus, that Kees Schouhamer Immink had designed for the MMCD, because it makes it possible to apply the existing CD servo technology. Its drawback was a loss from 5 to 4.7 Gigabytes of capacity.

As a result, the DVD specification provided a storage capacity of 4.7 GB (4.38 GiB) (Note: 1 GB is one billion bytes) for a single-layered, single-sided disc and 8.5 GB (7.92 GiB) for a dual-layered, single-sided disc. The DVD specification ended up similar to Toshiba and Matsushita's Super Density Disc, except for the dual-layer option. MMCD was single-sided and optionally dual-layer, whereas SD was two half-thickness, single-layer discs which were pressed separately and then glued together to form a double-sided disc.

Philips and Sony decided that it was in their best interests to end the format war, and on September 15, 1995 agreed to unify with companies backing the Super Density Disc to release a single format, with technologies from both. After other compromises between MMCD and SD, the group of computer companies won the day, and a single format was agreed upon. The computer companies also collaborated with the Optical Storage Technology Association (OSTA) on the use of their implementation of the ISO-13346 file system (known as Universal Disk Format) for use on the new DVDs. The format's details were finalized on December 8, 1995.

In November 1995, Samsung announced it would start mass-producing DVDs by September 1996. The format launched on November 1, 1996, in Japan, mostly with music video releases. The first major releases from Warner Home Video arrived on December 20, 1996, with four titles being available. (Note: The four titles being The Fugitive, Blade Runner: Director's Cut, Eraser, and Assassins.) The format's release in the U.S. was delayed multiple times, from August 1996, to October 1996, November 1996, before finally settling on early 1997. Players began to be produced domestically that winter, with March 24, 1997, as the U.S. launch date of the format proper in seven test markets. (Note: These test markets were in Chicago, Dallas, Los Angeles, New York City, San Francisco, Seattle, and Washington, D.C.) Approximately 32 titles were available on launch day, mainly from the Warner Bros., MGM, and New Line libraries, (Note: Three additional titles, including GoldenEye; are not listed in this article but are mentioned in other launch-day sources, most of which are dead links.) with the notable inclusion of the 1996 film Twister. However, the launch was planned for the following day (March 25), leading to a distribution change with retailers and studios to prevent similar violations of breaking the street date. The nationwide rollout for the format happened on August 22, 1997.

DTS announced in late 1997 that they would be coming onto the format. The sound system company revealed details in a November 1997 online interview, and clarified it would release discs in early 1998. However, this date would be pushed back several times before finally releasing their first titles at the 1999 Consumer Electronics Show.

In 2001, blank DVD recordable discs cost the equivalent of $27.34 US dollars in 2022.

=== Adoption ===
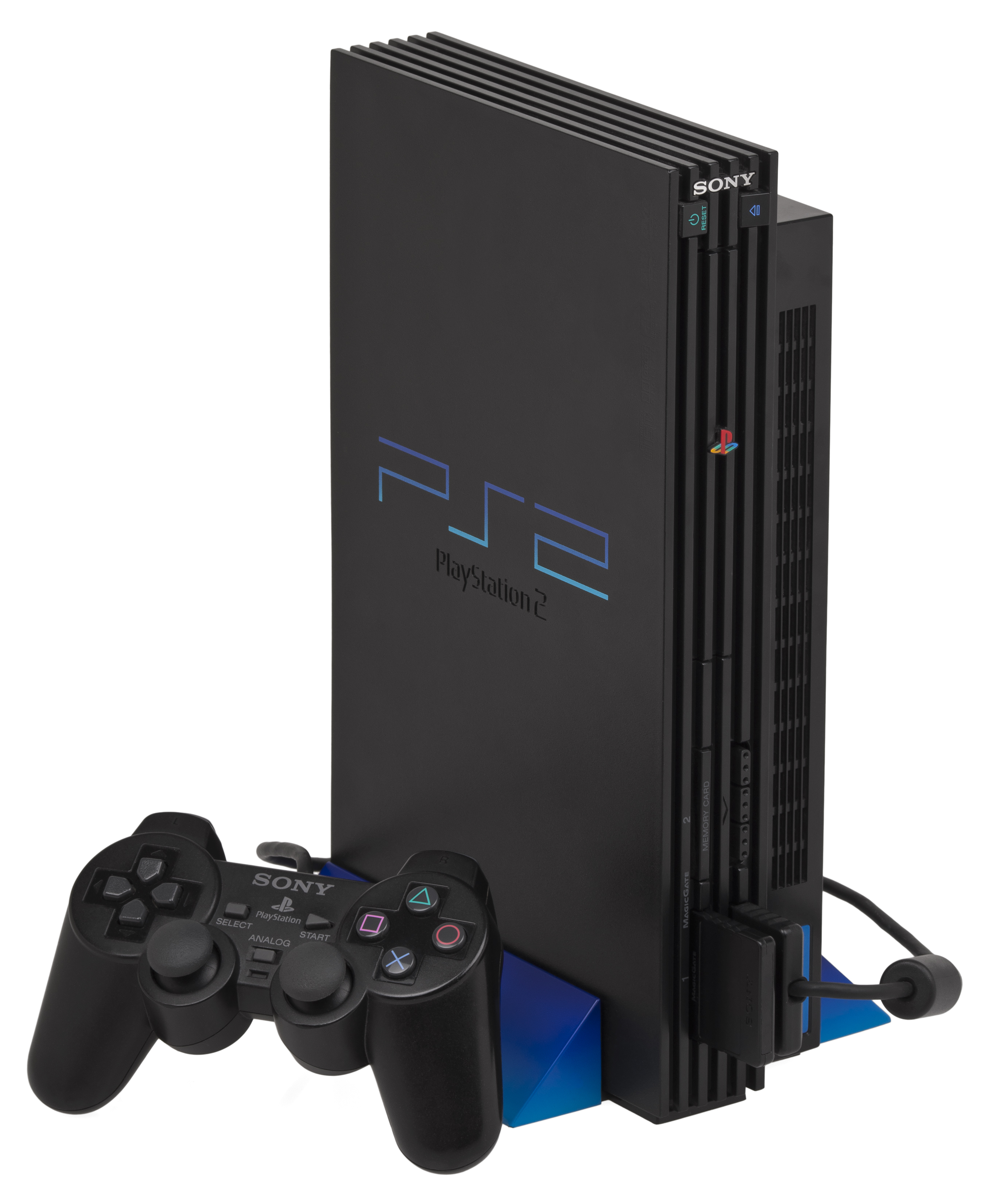
PlayStation 2, the first video game console to run DVDs

Movie and home entertainment distributors adopted the DVD format to replace the ubiquitous VHS tape as the primary consumer video distribution format.

Immediately following the formal adoption of a unified standard for DVD, two of the four leading video game console companies (Sega and The 3DO Company) said they already had plans to design a gaming console with DVDs as the source medium. Sony stated at the time that they had no plans to use DVD in their gaming systems, despite being one of the developers of the DVD format and eventually the first company to actually release a DVD-based console. Game consoles such as the PlayStation 2, Xbox, and Xbox 360 use DVDs as their source medium for games and other software. Contemporary games for Windows were also distributed on DVD. Early DVDs were mastered using DLT tape, but using DVD-R DL or +R DL eventually became common. TV DVD combos, combining a standard definition CRT TV or an HD flat panel TV with a DVD mechanism under the CRT or on the back of the flat panel, and VCR/DVD combos were also available for purchase.

For consumers, DVD soon overtook VHS as the favored choice for home movie releases. In 2001, DVD players outsold VCRs for the first time in the United States. At that time, one in four American households owned a DVD player. By 2007, about 80% of Americans owned a DVD player, a figure that had surpassed VCRs; it was also higher than personal computers or cable television.

== Specifications ==
Comparison of several forms of disk storage. Green denotes start and red denotes end of track.

The DVD specifications created and updated by the DVD Forum are published as so-called DVD Books (e.g. DVD-ROM Book, DVD-Audio Book, DVD-Video Book, DVD-R Book, DVD-RW Book, DVD-RAM Book, DVD-AR (Audio Recording) Book, DVD-VR (Video Recording) Book, etc.). DVD discs are made up of two discs; normally one is blank, and the other contains data. Each disc is 0.6 mm thick, and they are glued together to form a DVD disc. The gluing process must be done carefully to make the disc as flat as possible to avoid both birefringence and "disc tilt", which is when the disc is not perfectly flat, preventing it from being read.

Some specifications for mechanical, physical and optical characteristics of DVD optical discs can be downloaded as freely available standards from the ISO website. There are also equivalent European Computer Manufacturers Association (Ecma) standards for some of these specifications, such as Ecma-267 for DVD-ROMs. Also, the DVD+RW Alliance publishes competing recordable DVD specifications such as DVD+R, DVD+R DL, DVD+RW or DVD+RW DL. These DVD formats are also ISO standards.

Some DVD specifications (e.g. for DVD-Video) are not publicly available and can be obtained only from the DVD Format/Logo Licensing Corporation (DVD FLLC) for a fee of US$5000. Every subscriber must sign a non-disclosure agreement as certain information on the DVD Books is proprietary and confidential.

In January 2025, the DVD FLLC announced its own dissolution on January 31, 2025 (together with the DVD Forum itself, according to its charter) and the deposit of the DVD specifications at the National Diet Library of Japan in early 2025.

As of August 2025, the specification documents are only available at the National Diet Library in Tokyo.

=== Double-sided discs ===
Borrowing from the LaserDisc format, the DVD standard includes DVD-10 discs (Type B in ISO) with two recorded data layers such that only one layer is accessible from either side of the disc. This doubles the total nominal capacity of a DVD-10 disc to 9.4 GB (8.75 GiB), but each side is locked to 4.7 GB. Like DVD-5 discs, DVD-10 discs are defined as single-layer (SL) discs.

=== Dual-layer discs ===
DVD hardware accesses the additional layer (layer 1) by refocusing the laser through an otherwise normally-placed, semitransparent first layer (layer 0). This laser refocus—and the subsequent time needed to reacquire laser tracking—can cause a noticeable pause in A/V playback on earlier DVD players, the length of which varies between hardware. A printed message explaining that the layer-transition pause was not a malfunction became standard on DVD keep cases. During mastering, a studio could make the transition less obvious by timing it to occur just before a camera angle change or other abrupt shift, an early example being the DVD release of Toy Story. Later in the format's life, larger data buffers and faster optical pickups in DVD players made layer transitions effectively invisible regardless of mastering.

Dual-layer DVDs are recorded using Opposite Track Path (OTP).

=== Combinations of the above ===
The DVD Book also permits an additional disc type called DVD-14: a hybrid double-sided disc with one dual-layer side, one single-layer side, and a total nominal capacity of 12.3 GB. DVD-14 has no counterpart in ISO.

Both of these additional disc types are extremely rare due to their complicated and expensive manufacturing. For this reason, some DVDs that were initially issued as double-sided discs were later pressed as two-disc sets.

Note: The above sections regarding disc types pertain to 12 cm discs. The same disc types exist for 8 cm discs: ISO standards still regard these discs as Types A–D, while the DVD Book assigns them distinct disc types. DVD-14 has no analogous 8 cm type. The comparative data for 8 cm discs is provided further down.

== DVD recordable and rewritable ==
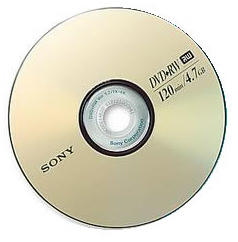
Sony Rewritable DVD

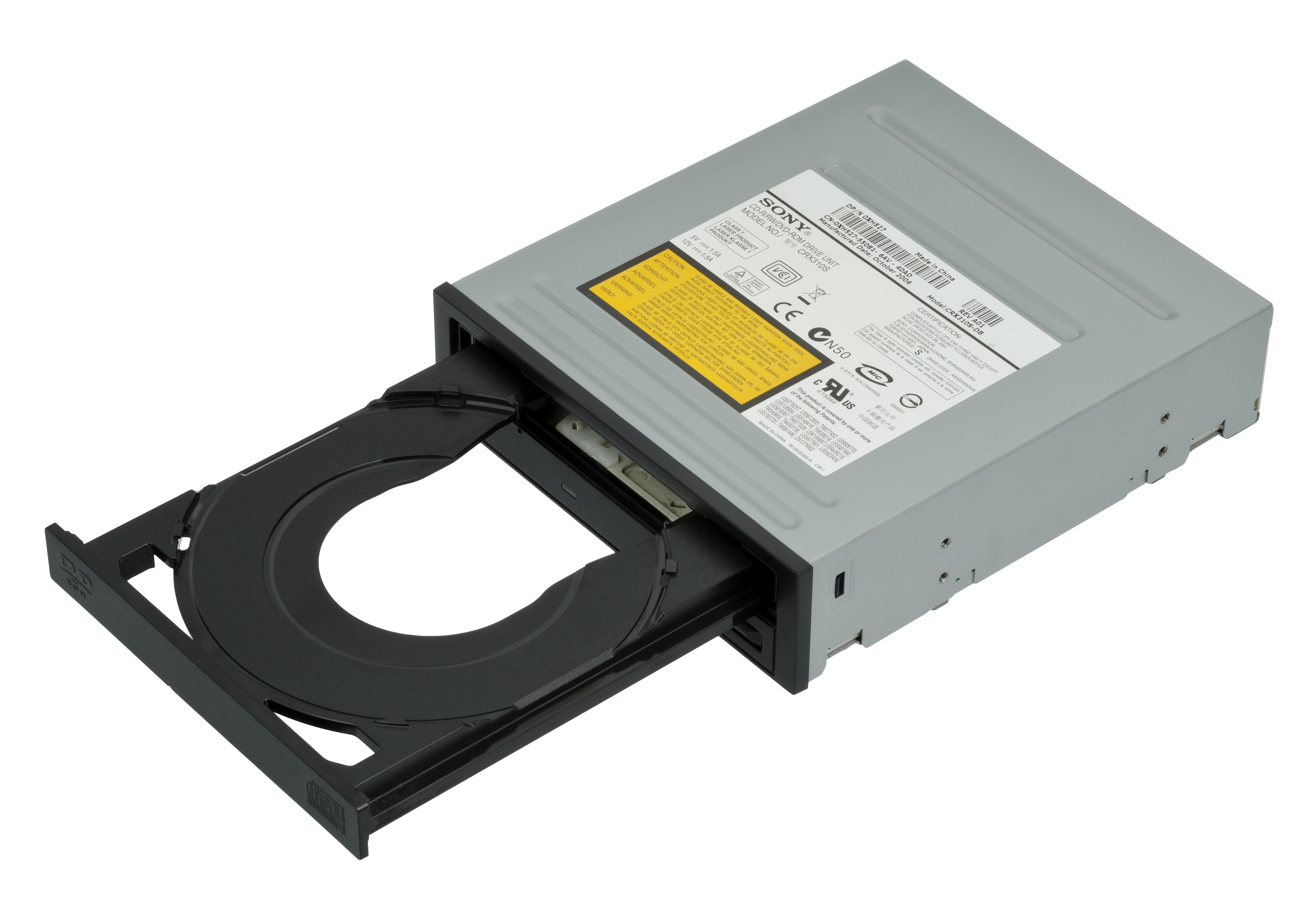
A DVD-ROM drive for a PC

HP initially developed recordable DVD media from the need to store data for backup and transport. DVD recordables are now also used for consumer audio and video recording. Three formats were developed: DVD-R/RW, DVD+R/RW (plus), and DVD-RAM. DVD-R is available in two formats, General (650 nm) and Authoring (635 nm), where Authoring discs may be recorded with CSS encrypted video content but General discs may not.

=== Dual-layer recording ===
Dual-layer recording (occasionally called double-layer recording) allows DVD-R and DVD+R discs to store nearly double the data of a single-layer disc—8.5 and 4.7 gigabyte capacities, respectively. The additional capacity comes at a cost: DVD±DLs have slower write speeds as compared to DVD±R. DVD-R DL was developed for the DVD Forum by Pioneer Corporation; DVD+R DL was developed for the DVD+RW Alliance by Mitsubishi Kagaku Media (MKM) and Philips.

Recordable DVD discs supporting dual-layer technology are backward-compatible with some hardware developed before the recordable medium.

== Capacity ==
Capacity and nomenclature SS = single-sided, DS = double-sided, SL = single-layer, DL = dual-layer
Designation		Sides	Layers (total)	Diameter (cm)	Capacity
Designation		Sides	Layers (total)	Diameter (cm)	(GB)
DVD-1	SS SL	1	1	8	1.46
DVD-2	SS DL	1	2	8	2.65
DVD-3	DS SL	2	2	8	2.92
DVD-4	DS DL	2	4	8	5.31
DVD-5	SS SL	1	1	12	4.70
DVD-9	SS DL	1	2	12	8.54
DVD-10	DS SL	2	2	12	9.40
DVD-14	DS SL+DL	2	3	12	13.24
DVD-18	DS DL	2	4	12	17.08

All units are expressed with SI/IEC prefixes (i.e., 1 Gigabyte = 1,000,000,000 bytes).

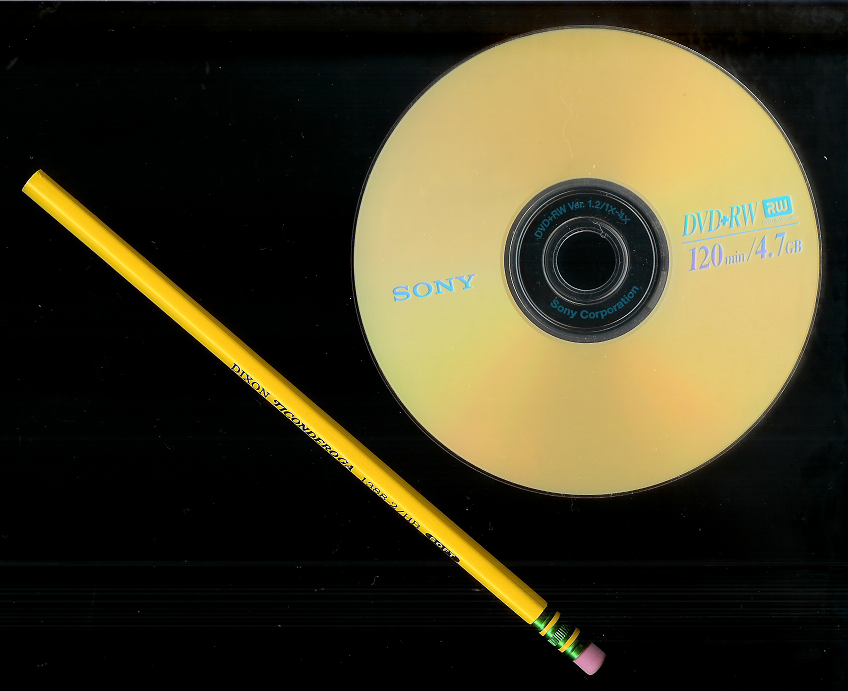
Size comparison: a 12 cm DVD+RW and a 19 cm pencil

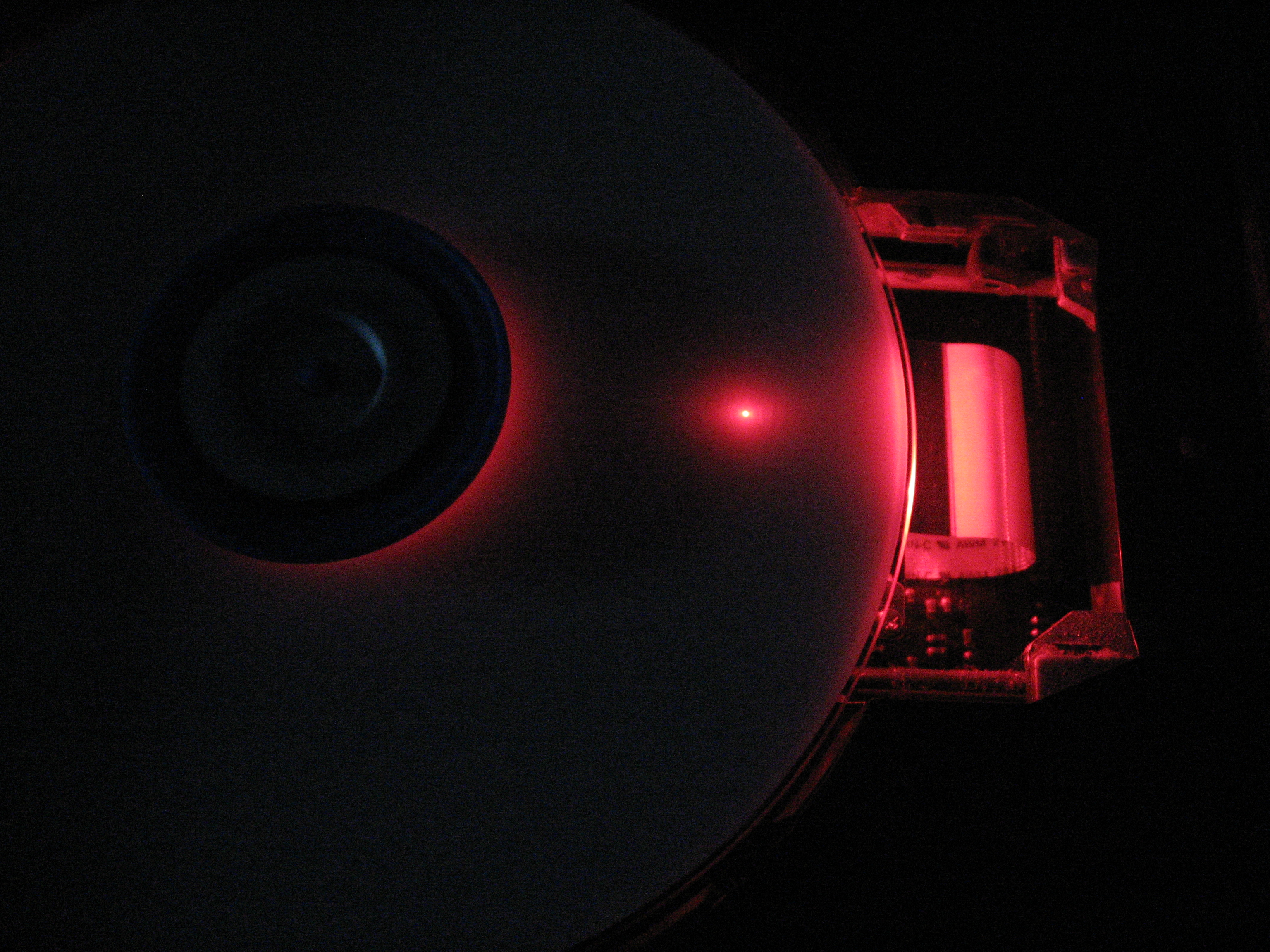
DVD-RW Drive operating (performing a burning (writing) operation) with its protective cover removed

Capacity and nomenclature of (re)writable discs
Designation		Sides	Layers (total)	Diameter (cm)	Capacity
Designation		Sides	Layers (total)	Diameter (cm)	(GB)
DVD-R	SS SL (1.0)	1	1	12	3.95
DVD-R	SS SL (2.0)	1	1	12	4.70
DVD-RW	SS SL	1	1	12	4.70
DVD+R	SS SL	1	1	12	4.70
DVD+RW	SS SL	1	1	12	4.70
DVD-R	SS DL	1	2	12	8.50
DVD-RW	SS DL	1	2	12	8.54
DVD+R	SS DL	1	2	12	8.54
DVD+RW	SS DL	1	2	12	8.54
DVD-RAM	SS SL	1	1	8	1.46*
DVD-RAM	DS SL	2	1	8	2.47*
DVD-RAM	SS SL (1.0)	1	1	12	2.58
DVD-RAM	SS SL (2.0)	1	1	12	4.70
DVD-RAM	DS SL (1.0)	2	1	12	5.15
DVD-RAM	DS SL (2.0)	2	1	12	9.39*

All units are expressed with SI/IEC prefixes (i.e., 1 Gigabyte = 1,000,000,000 bytes).

Capacity differences of writable DVD formats
Type	Sectors	Bytes	kB	MB	GB
DVD-R SL	2,298,496	4,707,319,808	4,707,320	4,707	4.7
DVD+R SL	2,295,104	4,700,372,992	4,700,373	4,700	4.7
DVD-R DL	4,171,712	8,543,666,176	8,543,666	8,544	8.5
DVD+R DL	4,173,824	8,547,991,552	8,547,992	8,548	8.5

All units are expressed with SI/IEC prefixes (i.e., 1 Gigabyte = 1,000,000,000 bytes).

== DVD drives and players ==
DVD drives are devices that can read DVD discs on a computer. DVD players are a particular type of devices that do not require a computer to work, and can read DVD-Video and DVD-Audio discs.

=== Transfer rates ===
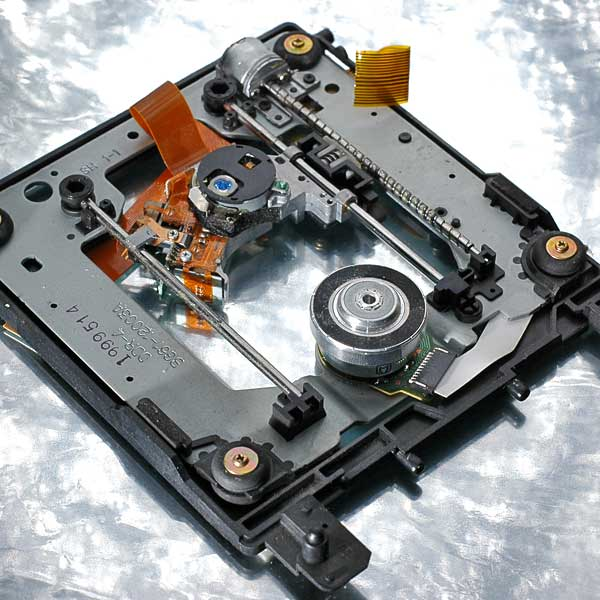
Internal mechanism of a DVD-ROM Drive. See text for details.

Read and write speeds for the first DVD drives and players were 1,385 kB/s (1,353 KiB/s); this speed is usually called "1×". More recent models, at 18× or 20×, have 18 or 20 times that speed. For CD drives, 1× means 153.6 kB/s (150 KiB/s), about one-ninth as swift.

DVD drive speeds
Drive speed (not rotations)	Data rate		~Write time (minutes) (Note: The write time is wildly optimistic for higher (>4x) write speeds, due to being calculated from the maximum drive write speed instead of the average drive write speed.)		Revolutions per minute (constant linear velocity, CLV) (Note: Due to the data track circumference of 12cm discs being 2.4 times as long at the outer edge as at the innermost edge of the data area, a constant angular velocity number equals the physical rotation speed the disc has when accessed with the same constant linear velocity number at the outermost edge. This means that the listed CLV (constant linear velocity) speeds at the outer edge equal the same number of rotations per minute as the same CAV (constant angular velocity) rating number.)
Drive speed (not rotations)	Mbit/s	MB/s	Single-Layer	Dual-Layer	Revolutions per minute (constant linear velocity, CLV)
1×	11	1.4	57	103	1400 (inner) 580 (outer)
2×	22	2.8	28	51	2800 (inner) 1160 (outer)
2.4×	27	3.3	24	43	3360 (inner) 1392 (outer)
2.6×	29	3.6	22	40	3640 (inner) 1508 (outer)
3×	33	4.1	19	34	4200 (inner) 2320 (outer)
4×	44	5.5	14	26	5600 (inner) 2900 (outer)
6×	67	8.3	9	17	8400 (inner) 3480 (outer)
8×	89	11.1	7	13	4640 (CAV; no longer uses pure CLV)
10×	111	13.9	6	10	5800
12×	133	16.6	5	9	6960
16×	177	22.2	4	6	9280
18×	199	24.9	3	6	10440
20×	222	27.7	3	5	11600
22×	244	30.5	3	5	12760
24×	266	33.2	2	4	13920

DVDs can spin at much higher speeds than CDs – DVDs can spin at up to 32000 RPM vs 23000 for CDs. In practice, they are not spun by optical drives anywhere close to these speeds to provide a safety margin. DVD drives limit reading speed to 16× (constant angular velocity), which means 9280 rotations per minute. Early-generation drives released before the mid-2000s have lower limits.

DVD recordable and rewritable discs can be read and written using either constant angular velocity (CAV), constant linear velocity (CLV), Partial constant angular velocity (P-CAV) or Zoned Constant Linear Velocity (Z-CLV or ZCLV).

Due to the slightly lower data density of dual layer DVDs (4.25 GB instead of 4.7 GB per layer), the required rotation speed is around 10% faster for the same data rate, which means that the same angular speed rating equals a 10% higher physical angular rotation speed. For that reason, the increase of reading speeds of dual layer media has stagnated at 12× (constant angular velocity) for half-height optical drives released since around 2005, (Note: The first optical drive model from a major optical drive vendor that achieved ×12 speeds on DVD-ROM Dual Layer was the Pioneer DVR-107 (2004). Later optical drives such as the HL data storage GSA-H10N (2006) have also achieved 12×(CAV) reading speeds on recordable dual-layer media (DVD-R DL, DVD+R DL), and TSSTcorp SH-S202/S203/TS-H653B (2007) achieved writing speeds of 12×(CAV) and 16×(CAV) on DVD-R DL and DVD+R DL respectively, on quality media from selected vendors.) and slim type optical drives are only able to record dual layer media at 6× (constant angular velocity), while reading speeds of 8× are still supported by such.

=== Disc quality measurements ===
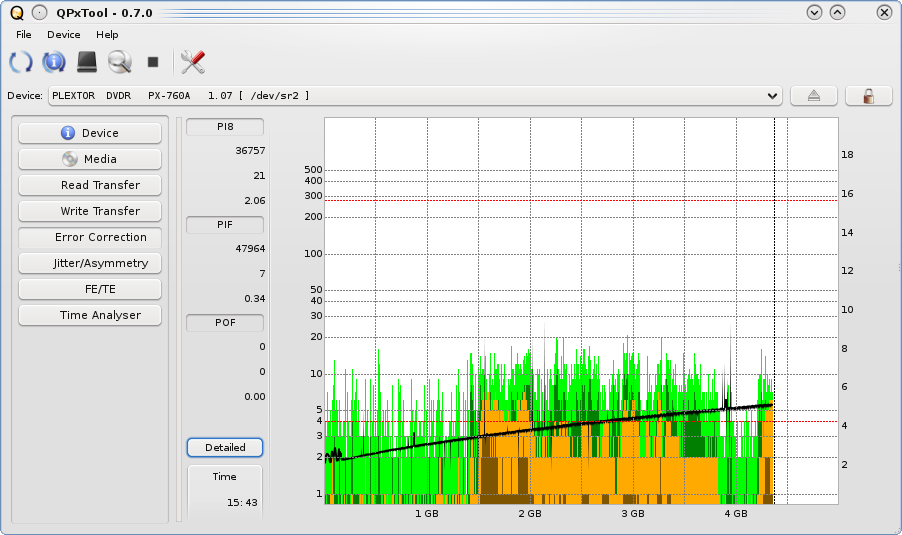
Error rate measurement on a DVD+R. The error rate is still within a healthy range.

The quality and data integrity of optical media is measureable, which means that future data losses caused by deteriorating media can be predicted well in advance by measuring the rate of correctable data errors.

The types of errors that can occur on a DVD are a PIE (Parity Inner Error), 8PIE (Parity Inner Sum Eight Error), PIF (Parity Inner Failure), POE (Parity Outer Error), and POF (Parity Outer Failure), the last of which indicates data loss. Too many small errors within a small space create a POF condition. The difference between POE and POF is that a POE is generated on a first failed read attempt whereas a POF indicates an uncorrectable error after repeated attempts to read the data.

Support of measuring the disc quality varies among optical drive vendors and models. Unreadable data can be found using any drive using general-purpose tools like badblocks.

== DVD-Video ==
DVD-Video is a standard for distributing video/audio content on DVD media. The format went on sale in Japan on November 1, 1996, in the United States on March 24, 1997, to line up with the 69th Academy Awards that day; in Canada, Central America, and Indonesia later in 1997; and in Europe, Australia, and Africa in 1998. DVD-Video became the dominant form of home video distribution in Japan when it first went on sale on November 1, 1996, but it shared the market for home video distribution in the United States for several years; it was June 15, 2003, when weekly DVD-Video in the United States rentals began outnumbering weekly VHS cassette rentals.

=== Security ===
The purpose of CSS is twofold:

1. CSS prevents byte-for-byte copies of an MPEG (digital video) stream from being playable since such copies do not include the keys that are hidden on the lead-in area of the restricted DVD.
2. CSS provides a reason for manufacturers to make their devices compliant with an industry-controlled standard, since CSS scrambled discs cannot in principle be played on noncompliant devices; anyone wishing to build compliant devices must obtain a license, which contains the requirement that the rest of the DRM system (region codes, Macrovision, and user operation prohibition) be implemented.

== Successors and decline ==
In 2006, two new formats called HD DVD and Blu-ray Disc were released as the successor to DVD. HD DVD competed unsuccessfully with Blu-ray Disc in the format war of 2006–2008. A dual layer HD DVD can store up to 30 GB and a dual layer Blu-ray disc can hold up to 50 GB.

However, unlike previous format changes, e.g., vinyl to Compact Disc or VHS videotape to DVD, initially there was no immediate indication that production of the standard DVD would gradually wind down, as at the beginning of the 2010s they still dominated, with around 75% of video sales and approximately one billion DVD player sales worldwide as of April 2011. In fact, experts claimed that the DVD would remain the dominant medium for at least another five years as Blu-ray technology was still in its introductory phase, write and read speeds being poor and necessary hardware being expensive and not readily available.

Consumers initially were also slow to adopt Blu-ray due to the cost. By 2009, 85% of stores were selling Blu-ray Discs. A high-definition television and appropriate connection cables are also required to take advantage of Blu-ray disc. Some analysts suggested that the biggest obstacle to replacing DVD was due to its installed base; a large majority of consumers were satisfied with DVDs.

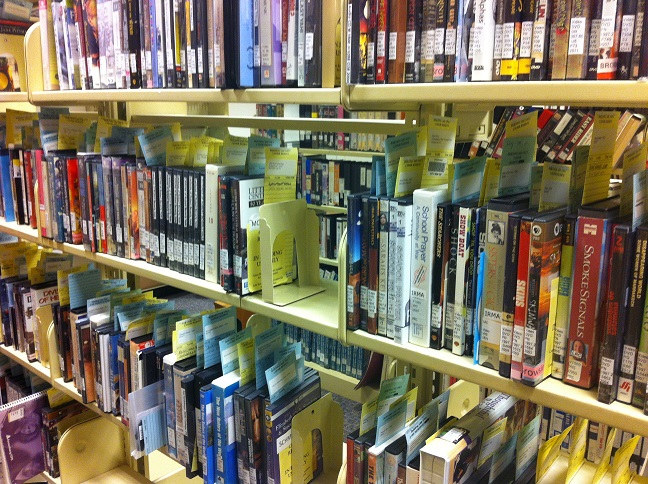
A library offering physical media including DVDs

DVDs started to face competition from video on demand services around 2015 or 2016. With increasing numbers of homes having high speed Internet connections, many people had the option to either rent or buy video from an online service, and view it by streaming it directly from that service's servers, meaning they no longer need any form of permanent storage media for video at all. By 2017, digital streaming services had overtaken the sales of DVDs and Blu-rays for the first time.

Until the end of the 2010s, manufacturers continued to release standard DVD titles, and the format remained the preferred one for the release of older television programs and films. Shows that were shot and edited entirely on film, such as Star Trek: The Original Series, could not be released in high definition without being re-scanned from the original film recordings. Shows that were made between the early 1980s and the early 2000s were generally shot on film, then transferred to video tape, and then edited natively in either NTSC or PAL; this makes high-definition transfers impossible, as these SD standards were baked into the final cuts of the episodes. Star Trek: The Next Generation was the only such show that had a Blu-ray release, as prints were re-scanned and edited from the ground up.

By the beginning of the 2020s, sales of DVD had dropped 86% with respect to the peak of DVD sales around 2005, while on-demand sales and, overall, subscription streaming of TV shows and movies grew by over 1,200%. At its peak, DVD sales represented almost two thirds of video market in the US; approximately 15 years later, around 2020, they fell to only 10% of the market.

By 2022, there was an increased demand of high definition media, where Ultra HD Blu-ray and regular Blu-ray formats made up for almost half of the US market while sales of physical media continued to shrink in favor of streaming services.

The decline of the physical home entertainment market accelerated into the 2020s, marked by major retailers Best Buy and Target discontinuing DVD sales in 2023. This contraction continued with Netflix concluding its historic DVD-by-mail rental service in 2025, and the bankruptcy and liquidation of the pioneering kiosk operator RedBox in 2024.

== Longevity ==
Longevity of a storage medium is measured by how long the data remains readable, assuming compatible devices exist that can read it: that is, how long the disc can be stored until data is lost. Numerous factors affect longevity: composition and quality of the media (recording and substrate layers), humidity and light storage conditions, the quality of the initial recording (which is sometimes a matter of mutual compatibility of media and recorder), etc. According to NIST, "[a] temperature of 64.4 °F (18 °C) and 40% RH [Relative Humidity] would be considered suitable for long-term storage. A lower temperature and RH is recommended for extended-term storage."

As with CDs, the information and data storage will begin to degrade over time with most standard DVDs lasting up to 30 years depending on the type of environment they are stored and whether they are full with data.

According to the Optical Storage Technology Association (OSTA), "Manufacturers claim lifespans ranging from 30 to 100 years for DVD, DVD-R and DVD+R discs and up to 30 years for DVD-RW, DVD+RW and DVD-RAM."

According to a NIST/LoC research project conducted in 2005–2007 using accelerated life testing, "There were fifteen DVD products tested, including five DVD-R, five DVD+R, two DVD-RW and three DVD+RW types. There were ninety samples tested for each product. ... Overall, seven of the products tested had estimated life expectancies in ambient conditions of more than 45 years. Four products had estimated life expectancies of 30–45 years in ambient storage conditions. Two products had an estimated life expectancy of 15–30 years and two products had estimated life expectancies of less than 15 years when stored in ambient conditions." The life expectancies for 95% survival estimated in this project by type of product are tabulated below:

Disc type	0–15 years	15–30 years	30–45 years	over 45 years
DVD-R	20%	20%	0%	60%
DVD+R	20%	0%	40%	40%
DVD-RW	0%	0%	50%	50%
DVD+RW	0%	33.3%	33.3%	33.3%

- 0–15 years
- 15–30 years
- 30–45 years
- over 45 years

== See also ==
- Book type
- Comparison of popular optical data-storage systems
- Digital video recorder
- DVD authoring
- DVD region code
- DVD single – Music video
- DVD TV game – Interactive film
- Glossary of computer hardware terms
- Hard disk drive performance characteristics
- M-DISC
- Professional Disc
- Ripping
