= X300 =

X300 may refer to:

- AMD X300 platform, a system on a chip solution for AMD Ryzen processors
- Dell Latitude X300
- ThinkPad X300
- Toshiba Qosmio X300
- Radeon X300
- Jaguar XJ (X300)
- Vivo X300 Ultra
