= Double-density compact disc =

Type of disc

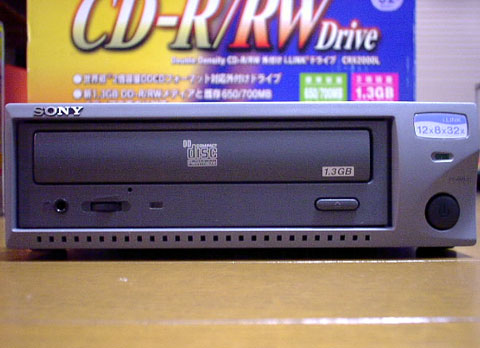
Sony CRX2000L DDCD Drive

The double-density compact disc (DDCD) is an optical disc technology developed by Sony and Philips using the same 780 nm laser wavelength as a compact disc. The format was announced in July 2000 and is defined by the Purple Book standard document. Unlike the compact disc technology on which it is based, DDCD was designed exclusively for data, with no audio capabilities.

For a 12 cm disc, it doubles the original 650 MB to 1.3 GB capacity of a CD on recordable (DDCD-R) and rewritable (DDCD-RW) discs by narrowing the track pitch from 1.6 to 1.1 micrometers, and shortening the minimum pit length from 0.833 to 0.623 micrometers. The DDCD was also available in read-only format (DDCD-ROM). The specification allowed for both 12 cm and 8 cm discs, although an 8 cm DDCD disc was never released.

The technology, released years after rewritable DVD technology, failed to acquire significant market share. The only DDCD recorder introduced was the Sony CRX200E. While the initial launch price of the drive and the disc ($249 and $2-3 respectively) were significantly lower than the prices of DVD-RW drives and media ($1000 and $10 respectively), the technology never prevailed over established DVD technology. A similar technology, however, was used in the GD-ROM discs primarily used for Sega Dreamcast software. DVDs offered a significantly higher capacity - nearly four times more than DDCD-R with 4.7 GB on single layer discs and six and a half times more with 8.5 GB on double layer discs. The price of DVDs would drop significantly in the years following DDCD's launch.

The 2006 edition of the SCSI Multimedia Commands set labeled the DDCD technology as 'legacy'.

== Competition ==
DDCD was part of a wave of technologies aimed at enhancing the original compact disc, none of which managed to gain widespread adoption.

MultiLevel Recording (ML), developed in 1992 by Optex Corporation, was a proposed technology that never released publicly. It promised to burn 2 GB onto one CD and a couple of disc burners from TDK and Plextor were set for release in 2002 for $200 with discs costing around $2. No ML products were ever released.

In September 2002, Sanyo announced it had achieved the same result as DDCD using standard CD-Rs with its HD-BURN technology. This allowed 1.4 GB of data to be burned to a standard 700 MB CD. However, the resulting CD could only be played back on DVD drives with compatible firmware.

In 2003, Plextor released a CD burner that utilized their proprietary GigaRec technology to allow users to burn a maximum of 980 MB on a standard 80-minute CD and 1.2 GB of a 99-minute CD. Like DDCD, the result was achieved by burning smaller pits. The resulting disc could be read without fail on Plextor GigaRec drives. Reading the disc on other optical drives were mixed.

== See also ==
- Blu-ray
- CD-R
- CD-RW
- GD-ROM
- DVD-ROM
- DVD-RW
- HD DVD
- MultiLevel Recording
- Rainbow Books
