= Calimetrics =

American technology company (1994–2004)

Calimetrics was an American technology company founded in 1994 by Terrence Wong, Michael O'Neill, and Thomas Burke. Based on Dr. Wong and Dr. O'Neill's UC Berkeley research, the company received startup funding of $1.8M from an Advanced Technology Program grant to conduct research and development on pit-depth modulated optical data storage systems. Over the years, Calimetrics raised approximately $50M from government, venture, angel, and corporate sources. Calimetrics was acquired in 2003 by LSI Logic and ceased operations in 2004.

== Technology ==
Pit depth modulation, which the company later branded MultiLevel Recording (ML), is one of many techniques to increase recording densities on conventional CD-optical media. Calimetrics' implementation of pit depth modulation, using modified CD drive electronics but no changes to the pickup-head, increased the quantity of distinguishable recording-marks from 2-levels (used by EFM in CD) to 8 levels. The increase in bit-density had a side benefit of increasing data-transfer rate (at the same rotational-velocity of the disc.) MultiLevel, like most of the other strategies proposed for extending CD capacity, was not backward compatible with CD-ROM technology: 2GB ML R, RW, and ROM disc playing and recording required ML-capable writers and special ML-CD compatible media. However, the cost to build CD rewriters with both ML and CD support was less than that of DVD-recordable technology.

Calimetrics's commercialization partners included Iomega, Texas Instruments, TDK, Mitsubishi Chemical, Matsushita Kotobuki Electronics (Panasonic), Sanyo Electric, and Shinano Kenshi (Plextor).

== History ==
In 2001, Calimetrics demonstrated hardware prototypes for a 2GB ML-CD reader/writer, using blank-media that was very similar to CD. By the time the ML-CD system was ready to enter consumer production (late 2001), CD-R/RW drives had dropped significantly in price due to the entry of Taiwanese producers and industry backing behind the various DVD recordable formats had become significant. In addition, the ill-fated Sony double-density CD format (DDCD) had already come and gone without any lasting impact on the market. This left ML-CD, another offshoot of the CD, with an uncertain outlook. Suffice it to say, without a launch commitment from drive and blank-media industry, ML-CD drives never reached the consumer-market.

When the company was acquired by LSI Logic in 2003, it had already begun work on ML-DVD. Like ML-CD, ML-DVD required new drive electronics and special ML media, but no change to the optical pickup-head. In terms of capacity, both ML-DVD-R (recordable) and ML-DVD-ROM discs were specified at 16GB for dual-layer, and 8GB for single-layer. Rewritable media (ML-DVD-RW) offered 8GB (single-layer.) Because of the shared physical characteristics with DVD-ROM pickups, the ML controller-chip was anticipated as a drop-in replacement for existing DVD-drives, greatly reducing cost of ML-DVD capable drives.

This time, Calimetrics faced competition from both above and below. From above, there were the two blue-laser formats - the Philips/Sony backed Blu-ray, and the Toshiba/NEC Advanced Optical Disc (AOD.) Both blue-laser formats were more costly, but offered greater storage (and industry backing.) From below, Taiwan's home-grown DVD-spinoff (called FVD: Forward Versatile Disc) offered less capacity than ML-DVD, but enjoyed the backing of Taiwan's governmental research agency as well as Taiwan's semiconductor industry.

The DVD Forum later approved the AOD proposal, which was officially in 2006 as the HD DVD format. The Blu-ray Consortium quickly followed and released their own players and movie titles to compete head-to-head against HD DVD. Meanwhile, China, the consumer market most likely to accept ML-DVD for domestic-use, instead chose Taiwan's FVD. Faced with dwindling opportunities to launch ML-DVD, LSI suspended research and development on MultiLevel Recording.
