= Shinano =

Shinano may refer to:

- Shinano, Nagano, a town in Nagano prefecture, Japan
- Shinano River, the longest river in Japan
- Shinano Province, one of the old provinces of Japan (Nagano Prefecture now)
- Japanese aircraft carrier Shinano, an aircraft carrier of the Imperial Japanese Navy
- Shinano (train) named after the province of old Japan
- Shinano Maru (1900), armed merchantman of the Battle of Tsushima
- Shinano Kenshi
