= DVD+R DS =

DVD+R Dual Side

DVD+R DS (DS stands for Double Side) a sub category of DVD+R. It can only be written once. (DVD+RW can be written, erased and rewritten)

DVD capacity
Diameter	Disk Type	Data sectors (2,048 B each)	Capacity		
cm	Disk Type	Data sectors (2,048 B each)	Bytes	MB	GB
12	DVD-R, DVD-RW (SS-SL)	2,298,496	4,707,319,808	4489.250	4.7
12	DVD+R, DVD+RW (SS-SL)	2,295,104	4,700,372,992	4482.625	4.7
12	DVD-R DL (SS)	4,171,712	8,543,666,176	8147.875	8.5
12	DVD+R DL (SS)	4,173,824	8,547,991,552	8152.000	8.5
12	DVD-R DS, DVD-RW DS (SL)	4,596,992	9,414,639,616	8978.500	9.4
12	DVD+R DS, DVD+RW DS (SL)	4,590,208	9,400,745,984	8965.250	9.4
12	DVD-R DS (DL)	8,343,424	17,087,332,352	16,295.750	17.0
12	DVD+R DS (DL)	8,347,648	17,095,983,104	16,304.000	17.0
SL / DL – Single/Dual layer; SS / DS – Single/Double sided

== See also ==
- DVD
- DVD+R
- DVD-R
- DVD+RW
- MultiLevel Recording
- List of optical disc manufacturers
