= LS-R =

Computer storage media

LS-R, or the Layer-Selection-Type Recordable Optical Disk, is the term coined by Hitachi in 2003 for a next-generation optical disc technology which allows much larger data storage densities than DVD, HD DVD or Blu-ray Disc, by allowing the use of many data layers in a single disc. In previous optical disc technologies, relatively few data layers can be incorporated in a single disc, since the reflections from the different layers interfere with each other. However, in LS-R, only the layer of interest generates a reflection, meaning that very many layers can theoretically be stacked in the same disc. This feat is accomplished by an electronic "selection" mechanism, whereby each data layer is coated with electrodes and only the electrodes associated with the layer of interest are activated. This activation changes the "selected" data layer from being transparent to being reflective or opaque, thus it can be addressed.

== Technology ==
In the Hitachi implementation, LS-R technology utilizes an electrochromic film, for example of tungsten oxide or an organic material to accomplish the optical change. A two-layer feasibility prototype has been demonstrated, and it was estimated that a 20-layer CD-sized disc could provide 1 terabyte (TB) of data capacity, with each layer containing 50 gigabytes (GB). Electrical activation of layers has been achieved with transparent ITO electrodes, and a contactless power supply has been developed in order to allow long-term operation, and given that the disc is spinning at several thousand revolutions per minute for a long time, the disk could technically run for weeks at a time.

== Commercial product ==
No plans or timeline for the development of a commercial product have been released. It is possible that this technology, while interesting, will remain in the realms of research, either because it is superseded by an alternative technology (such as holographic storage or another 3D optical data storage variant), or because it can not be made to be economically viable. The need for the disc to be meticulously constructed from many layers of different materials, and the need for the drive to be able to electrically address each layer specifically, may make this solution too expensive for commercialization.

In the next generation, the LS-R disk may compete with other next-generation optical disc formats, such as the Holographic versatile disc and Protein-coated disc formats.
