= Xbox 360 HD DVD Player =

Accessory for the Xbox 360 console

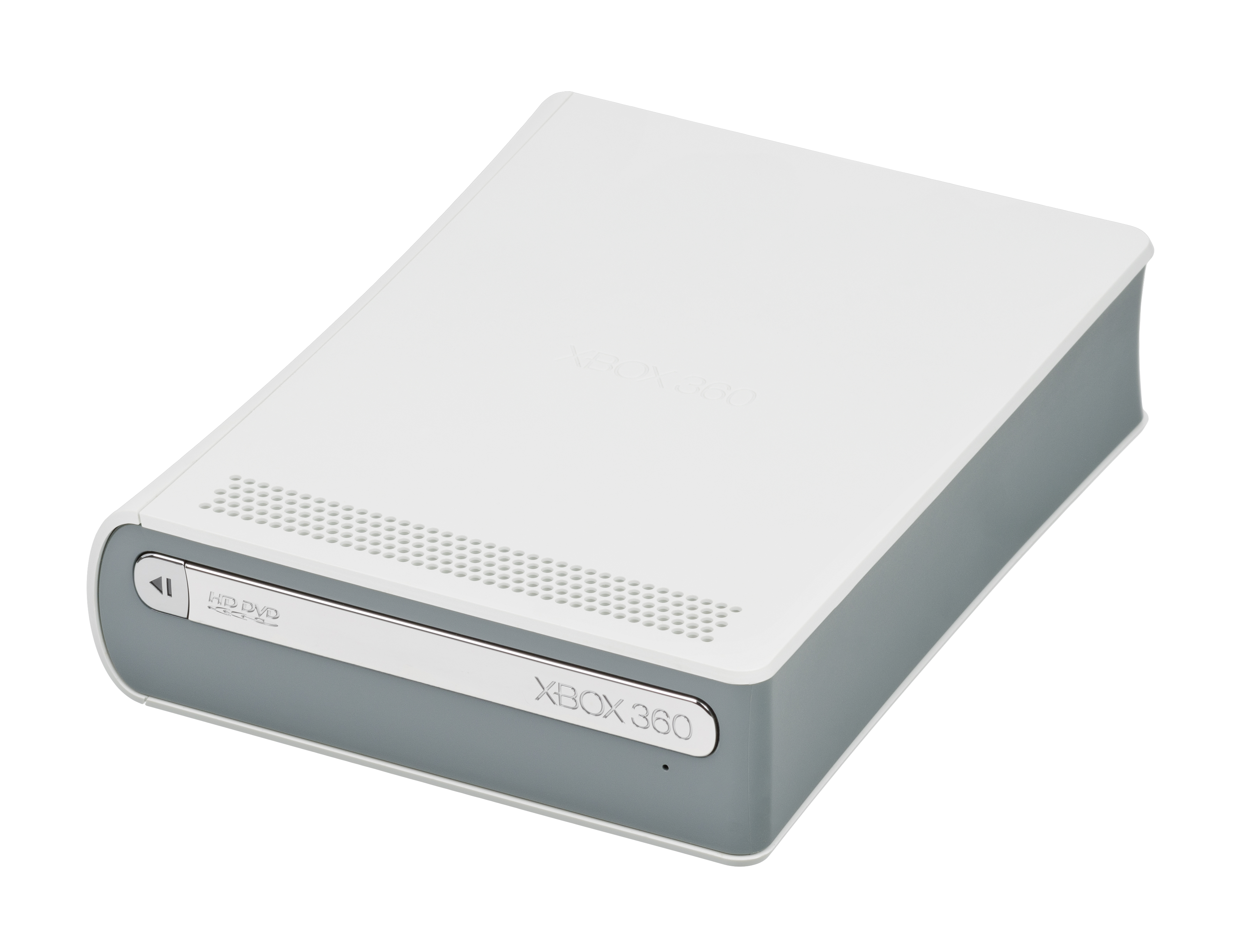
- Developer: Microsoft
- Product family: Xbox
- Type: High-density optical disc player
- Generation: Seventh generation
- Released: NA: November 7, 2006; JP: November 17, 2006; UK: November 28, 2006; AU: March 29, 2007
- Lifespan: 2006-2008
- Introductory price: US$199
- Discontinued: February 23, 2008
- Units sold: 316,000 in the US (as of December 31, 2007)
- Media: HD DVD, DVD
- Display: 1080p (via Xbox 360)
- Sound: Analog stereo, stereo LPCM, Dolby Digital, DTS
- Connectivity: USB 2.0

The Xbox 360 HD DVD Player is a discontinued accessory for the Xbox 360 console that enables the playback of movies on HD DVD discs. Microsoft offered the drive for sale between November 2006 and February 2008. It was initially sold for $199.

Bill Gates announced during his keynote speech at CES 2006 that an external HD DVD drive would be released for the Xbox 360 during 2006. At E3 2006, Microsoft officially presented the external HD DVD drive. According to Japan's chief of Xbox operations, Yoshihiro Maruyama, Microsoft would not release Xbox 360 games in the new disc formats.

On February 23, 2008, the Xbox 360 HD DVD player was discontinued by Microsoft. This decision came just days after Toshiba's announcement to discontinue all HD DVD players and effectively end the format war between Blu-ray and HD DVD. Two days later, the price of the HD DVD Player was reduced to a clearance price of $49.99. Peter Moore had stated that if HD DVD loses the format war, Microsoft may also release an external Blu-ray drive. This was later denied by Microsoft. All future iterations of the Xbox 360 console and dashboard maintained compatibility with the HD DVD player.

Special black versions of the drive, along with black media remotes, were given to members of the Xbox 360 HD DVD development team. Unlike other black accessories which were created alongside the black Elite console, the black HD DVD drive was never made available to the general public.

== Technology ==
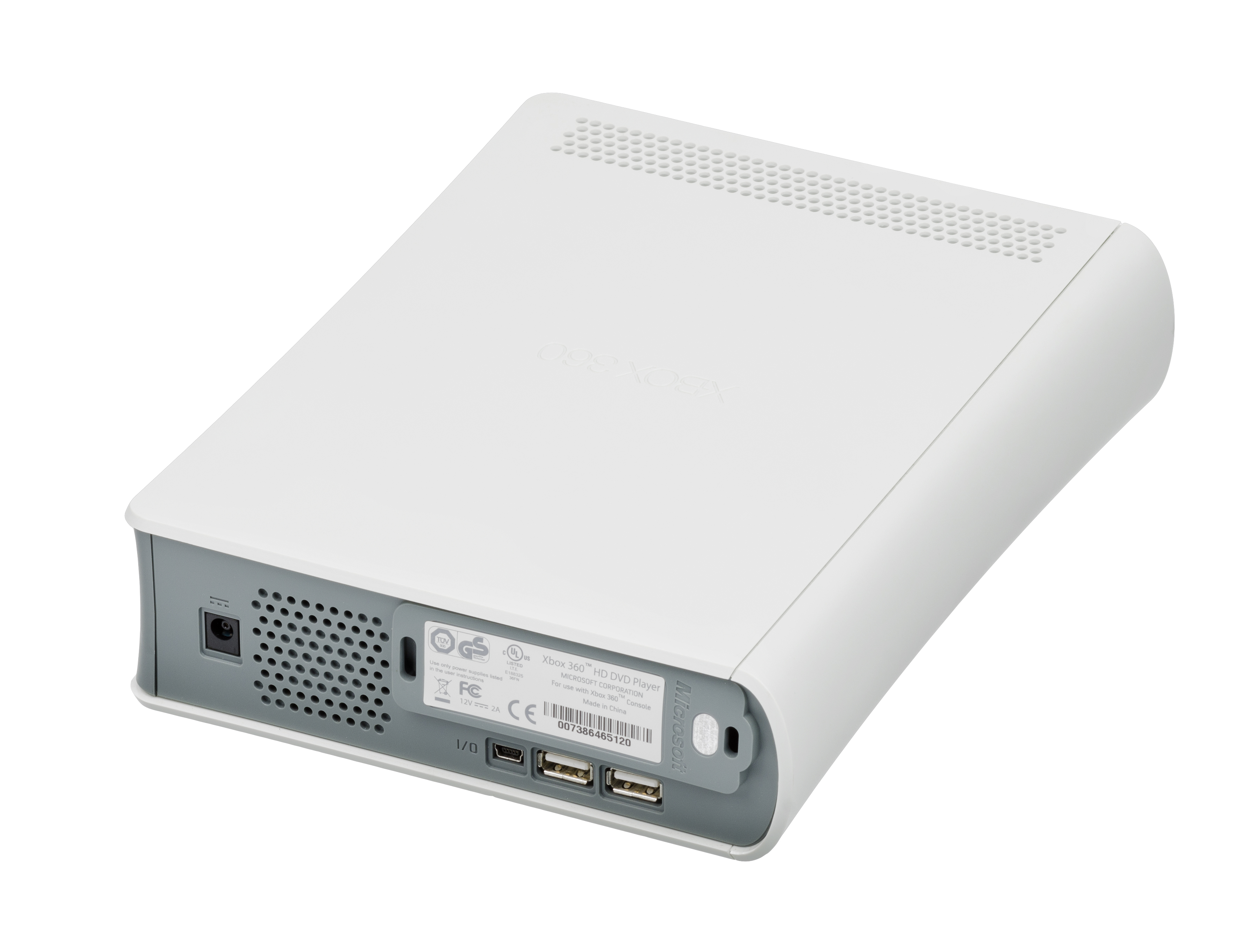
The rear of the HD DVD drive, showing extra USB ports and a dock for the Xbox 360 wireless adapter

The HD DVD player connects to the Xbox 360 using a mini USB connection. All of the audio and video processing and output come from Xbox 360 itself. The unit can also function as a USB hub, with 2 ports on the rear. It also includes a clip for attaching the wireless network adapter to it, much like what Xbox 360 consoles of the time had. The device also has an integrated 256 MB memory unit which is used for storage of HD DVD data and is accessible to the user for saving other data such as saved games.

The Xbox 360 allows the playback of DVDs in addition to HD DVD titles using this drive; however it does not allow the use of Xbox or Xbox 360 game discs, Audio CDs or mixed media discs. All Xbox 360 games continued to use DVD-9 media. No Xbox 360 with a built-in HD DVD drive was ever released.

=== Compatibility with PCs ===
The Toshiba optical drive used in the unit can read compact discs and DVDs in addition to HD DVDs when connected to a host that supports reading these formats (such as a PC). As the drive communicates via a generic mass storage protocol over USB the drive can be used as a standard optical drive on computers and operating systems that support USB optical drives. The operating system must have a UDF 2.5 driver to read data from HD DVDs. In addition a software player capable of playing HD DVD titles is required for playback of video. The 256 MB internal Memory Unit on the drive which is used for storage of HD DVD features is also accessible by manually installing USB Mass Storage drivers. Once installed, this can be formatted for use as a storage device although it will no longer function on an Xbox 360 unless it is reformatted.

Windows XP does not have a built in UDF 2.5 driver, instead requiring a third party one to be installed to access data on HD DVDs. Newer versions of Windows and Mac OS X 10.5 "Leopard" and later have native UDF 2.5 drivers. Mac OS X v10.5 introduced UDF 2.5 driver support for reading HD DVDs, but the included player software can only play HD DVDs authored by DVD Studio Pro.

=== In the box ===
The retail package of the HD DVD player contains the following:

- Xbox 360 HD DVD Player
- Setup disc
- AC adapter
- USB cable
- Universal Media Remote (full sized version)
- Batteries
- User manual
- Free HD DVD Title (in certain areas): King Kong (US/Canada/Australia), Batman Begins (Mexico)

=== Notes ===
- 1080p HD DVD playback is only available via VGA or HDMI cables. When connected via component or D-Terminal cables, 1080p content is downscaled to 1080i or lower.
- Output of Dolby Digital Plus, Dolby TrueHD, DTS-HD High Resolution Audio and DTS-HD Master Audio codecs, as well as multi-channel LPCM, is not supported on the Xbox 360 HD DVD player since the Xbox 360 itself does not support them. As a result, only conventional stereo LPCM, Dolby Digital and DTS (optional feature available within the HD DVD audio settings) are available as output, although HD audio can be enabled when used on PC.
- In the US, any purchases made between August 1 and September 30, 2007, included five free HD DVD movies. For the same SRP, online retailer Amazon.com increased the offer to a total of nine HD DVD titles when used with a mail-in rebate.
- Following its discontinuation, the HD DVD Player was reduced to $49.99 in the US and £39.99 in the UK, and still included the $19.99/£19.99 (SRP) Universal Media Remote, essentially making the price just $30/£20. On May 1, 2008 Xtra-vision reduced the price to £6.99.
