= Vivo X300 Pro =

2025 flagship Android smartphone by Vivo

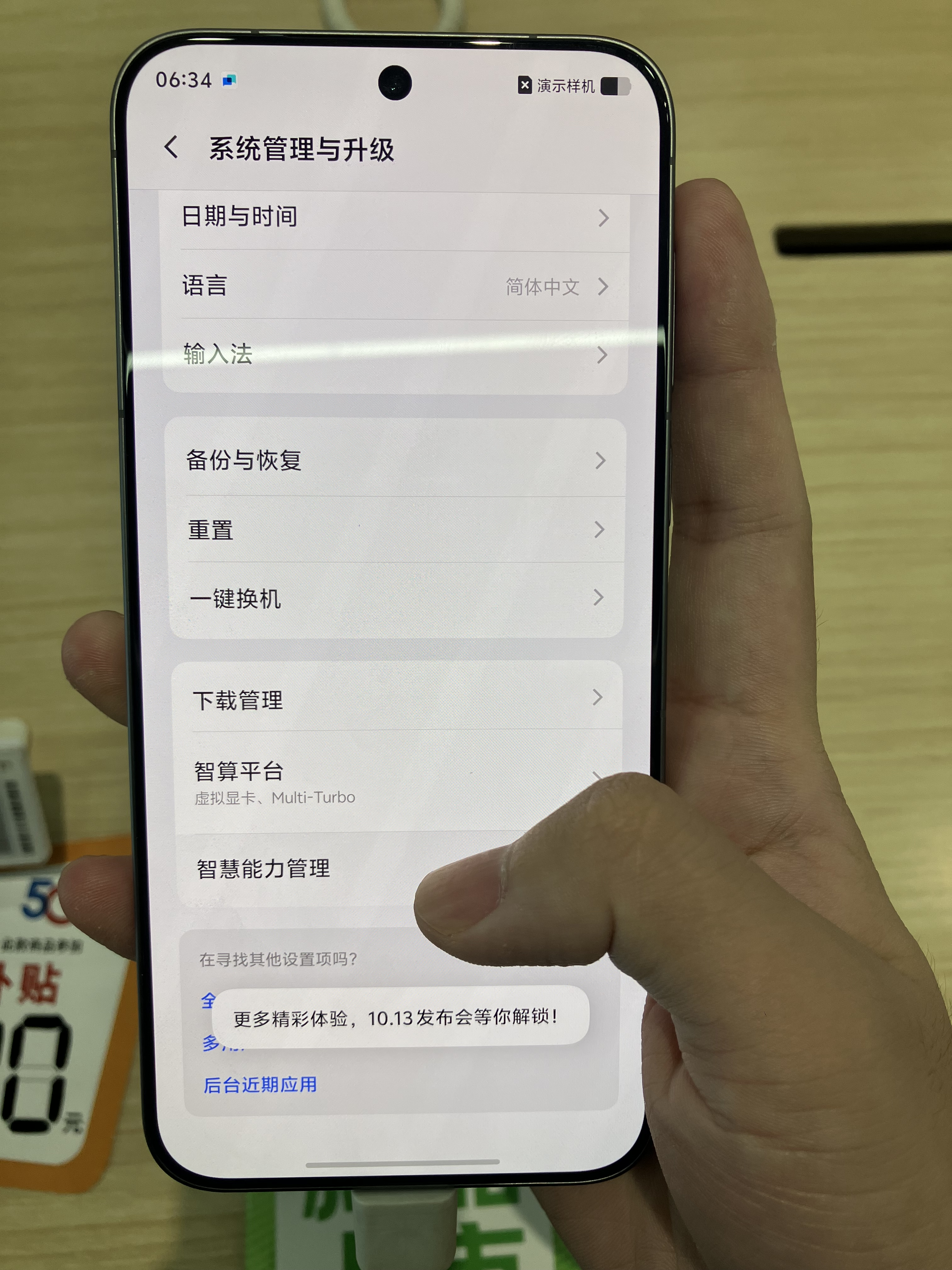
- Vivo X300 Pro
- Developer: Vivo
- Manufacturer: Vivo
- Type: smartphone
- Series: Vivo X series
- First released: October 17, 2025; 11 months ago
- Predecessor: Vivo X200 Pro
- Successor: Vivo X500 Pro
- Related: Vivo X300; Vivo X300 Ultra; Vivo X300 FE (Russian version has different hardware); Vivo X300s; Vivo X300 E (the E is not pronounced)
- Compatible networks: GSM / HSPA / LTE / 5G
- Form factor: Slate
- Colors: Phantom Black; Mist Blue; Dune Brown; Cloud White
- Dimensions: 161.2 mm × 75.5 mm × 8 mm (6.35 in × 2.97 in × 0.31 in)
- Weight: 226 g (8.0 oz)
- Operating system: Android 16 with OriginOS 6
- System-on-chip: MediaTek Dimensity 9500 (3 nm)
- CPU: Octa-core (1×4.21 GHz C1-Ultra, 3×3.5 GHz C1-Premium, 4×2.7 GHz C1-Pro)
- GPU: Arm G1-Ultra
- Modem: Integrated 5G
- Memory: 12 GB or 16 GB LPDDR5X
- Storage: 256 GB, 512 GB or 1 TB (UFS 4.1)
- SIM: Nano-SIM + Nano-SIM + eSIM (max 2 active, International); Nano-SIM + Nano-SIM (China)
- Battery: 6510 mAh (Si/C) Global; 5440 mAh EU
- Charging: 90 W wired (PD3.0); 40 W wireless; Reverse wired; Reverse wireless
- Rear camera: 50 MP, f/1.6, 24 mm (wide), PDAF, OIS (Sony LYT-828); 200 MP, f/2.7, 85 mm (telephoto), PDAF, OIS, 3.7× optical zoom (Samsung ISOCELL); 50 MP, f/2.0, 15 mm (ultrawide camera), AF (Samsung S5KJN1); Rear video: 8K@30 fps, 4K@30/60/120 fps, 1080p@30/60/120/240 fps, gyro-EIS, Dolby Vision HDR
- Front camera: 50 MP, f/2.0, 20 mm (wide), AF (Samsung S5KJN1): Front video: 4K@30/60 fps, 1080p@30/60 fps
- Display: 6.78 in (172 mm) LTPO OLED, 1B colors 1260 × 2800 px @ 120 Hz; HDR10, HDR Vivid, Dolby Vision; Up to 4500 nits (peak), ~1600 nits (HBM); Armor Glass
- Sound: Stereo speakers, 24-bit/192 kHz Hi-Res audio
- Connectivity: Wi-Fi 6E (802.11 a/b/g/n/ac/6/7); Bluetooth 5.4 (A2DP, LE, aptX HD, LHDC 5); NFC; Infrared port USB-C 3.2 OTG; GPS (L1+L5), GLONASS, BDS, Galileo, QZSS, NavIC
- Water resistance: IP68/IP69 dust and water resistant
- Other: Ultrasonic under-display fingerprint sensor, noise-canceling microphones, vapor chamber cooling system, satellite connectivity support (optional)

Vivo X300 Pro is a flagship Android-based smartphone developed and manufactured by Vivo. It was announced on October 13, 2025, and released on October 17, 2025, as part of the Vivo X300 series.

== Specifications ==
=== Display ===
The Vivo X300 Pro features a 6.78-inch LTPO OLED display with a resolution of 1260 × 2800 pixels and a 120 Hz adaptive refresh rate. The display supports HDR10, HDR Vivid, and Dolby Vision, with peak brightness rated up to 4500 nits (peak) and approximately 1600 nits in high-brightness mode. The panel is protected by Armor Glass and includes an under-display ultrasonic fingerprint sensor.

=== Performance ===
The device is powered by the MediaTek Dimensity 9500 chipset manufactured on a 3 nm process. It includes an octa-core CPU and an Arm G1-Ultra GPU. Memory configurations include 12 GB or 16 GB of LPDDR5X RAM, paired with 256 GB, 512 GB, or 1 TB of UFS 4.1 internal storage. A vapor chamber cooling system is included to manage thermal output during sustained workloads. The device does not support expandable storage.

=== Camera ===
The Vivo X300 Pro is equipped with a triple rear camera system consisting of a 50 MP wide camera using a Sony LYT-828 sensor with PDAF and OIS, a 200 MP periscope telephoto camera using a Samsung ISOCELL sensor with 3.7× optical zoom and macro capability, and a 50 MP ultrawide camera based on the Samsung S5KJN1 sensor with autofocus. Additional camera hardware includes laser autofocus, a color spectrum sensor, Zeiss optics with T* coating, and 3D LUT import support.

Video recording supports up to 8K at 30 fps and 4K at up to 120 fps, including 10-bit Log and Dolby Vision HDR formats.

The front-facing camera uses a 50 MP Samsung S5KJN1 sensor with autofocus and supports up to 4K video recording.

=== Build and durability ===
The Vivo X300 Pro features a glass front and back with an aluminum alloy frame. It measures 161.2 × 75.5 × 8 mm and weighs 226 g. The device is certified to IP68 and IP69 standards for dust and water resistance, including protection against high-pressure water jets and immersion up to 1.5 meters for 30 minutes.

=== Audio ===
The device includes stereo speakers with support for 24-bit/192 kHz Hi-Res audio. Multiple noise-canceling microphones are used to reduce background noise during calls and video recording.

=== Battery ===
The smartphone is powered by a Si/C lithium-ion battery with a capacity of 6510 mAh in global markets and 5440 mAh in EU markets. It supports 90 W wired charging (PD3.0), 40 W wireless, as well as reverse wired and reverse wireless charging.

=== Software ===
The Vivo X300 Pro ships with Android 16 and OriginOS 6. Vivo has announced support for up to five major Android version upgrades.
