= GD-ROM =

Proprietary optical disc format used in the Dreamcast and other Sega systems

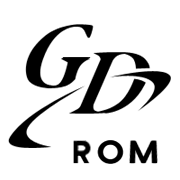

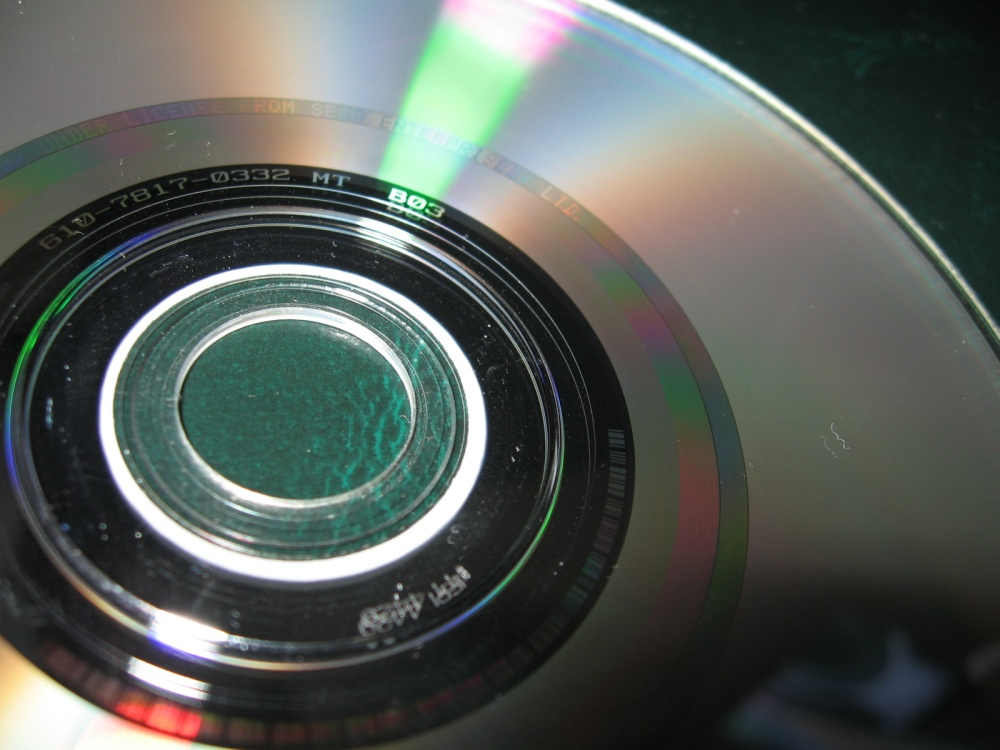
- The underside of a GD-ROM disc
- Media type: Optical disc
- Capacity: 1 GB
- Developed by: Yamaha
- Usage: Dreamcast; Sega Chihiro; Sega NAOMI; Triforce

The GD-ROM (gigabyte disc read-only memory) is a proprietary optical disc format developed as a collaboration between Sega and Yamaha for the Dreamcast and other Sega systems.

== Specification ==
A double-density format based on the CD-ROM that could hold up to 1 GB, it consists of a single-density track near the disc's center surrounded by a double-density track comprising much of the disc's capacity. The GD-ROM was created in response to developers exceeding the typical 650 MB storage capacity of the CD-ROM; while DVD-ROM would have addressed this limitation, implementing its then-new technology would have made console production cost-prohibitive. Along with the format's general novelty, the extra capacity also had the theoretical benefit of curbing video game piracy, a major concern of CD-based consoles that was validated by its rampancy on the PlayStation.

== Dreamcast console ==
The Dreamcast was considered by the video game industry as one of the most secure consoles on the market with its use of the GD-ROM, but this was nullified by a flaw in the Dreamcast's support for the MIL-CD (Music Interactive Live-CD) format, a proprietary Mixed Mode CD developed by Sega that allowed enhanced multimedia playback such as displaying graphics alongside CD audio. (Note: The MIL-CD is only compatible with Japanese Dreamcast consoles due to regional lockout.) (Note: Unlike other mixed mode CDs, MIL-CD was capable of muting its data section from playback on typical CD players, preventing potential damage to connected speakers. Some GD-ROM titles include such a warning as an audio track.) A hacker group named Utopia released their exploit in June 2000, having discovered that they could replace the graphics with Dreamcast code, enabling games burned onto CD-Rs to run on the console without any modding; boot discs were initially used to facilitate this effort, but hackers subsequently discovered the ability to have burned games self-boot without the need for a boot disc. The main protection was to scramble the EXE file on the disc. The Dreamcast console would unscramble it in memory if a GD-ROM was inserted; however when loading from an MIL-CD, the EXE file was loaded directly into memory, bypassing the copy protection. While copying Dreamcast games onto a CD-ROM sometimes required the removal of certain game features, this did not affect their playability; such games were typically distributed on file sharing networks such as Internet Relay Chat. Sega initially responded by aggressively pursuing cease and desist orders against online marketplaces selling pirated games, announcing the effort a month after the exploit's release; the company eventually released a new revision of the Dreamcast hardware that removed MIL-CD support towards the end of 2000, closing the loophole. Games released around that time also began to incorporate a more robust copy protection system to thwart illegitimate use.

Before the Dreamcast was released, Sega "confirmed that Dreamcast owners will one day be able to upgrade the GD-ROM drive to DVD" as part of its general expansion system to keep it competitive against more powerful contemporaries. In June 1999, The Nihon Keizai Shimbun reported on the development of a DVD distribution system by Sega alongside Hitachi, Nippon Columbia, and an additional partner; one known planned use for it involved encrypted multi-title releases that were to be accessed via downloadable product keys. Despite displaying a Dreamcast DVD display unit at E3 2000, the plans for a DVD add-on or fully separate unit never materialized during the short production run of the Dreamcast, rendering it the only sixth generation console to not adopt the format.

== Arcade systems ==
GD-ROM was also made available as an upgrade for the Dreamcast's arcade cousin, Sega NAOMI and the later Sega NAOMI 2, providing alternate media to its cartridge-based software. It is also used as an option on both the Sega Chihiro and Triforce, respectively based on the Xbox and GameCube consoles.

The GD-ROM drive in the Dreamcast reads data in constant angular velocity (CAV) mode at up to 12× speed.

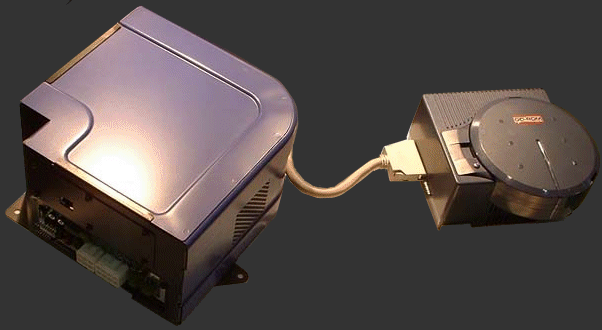
GD-ROM drive as an option on Triforce

== See also ==
- Nintendo optical discs
- Double-density compact disc
- MIL-CD
- Universal Media Disc

== Bibliography ==
- Carless, Simon (2004). Gaming Hacks. O'Reilly Media. ISBN 978-0-596-00714-0 – via Google Books.
