= Vivo X300 Ultra =

2026 flagship Android smartphone

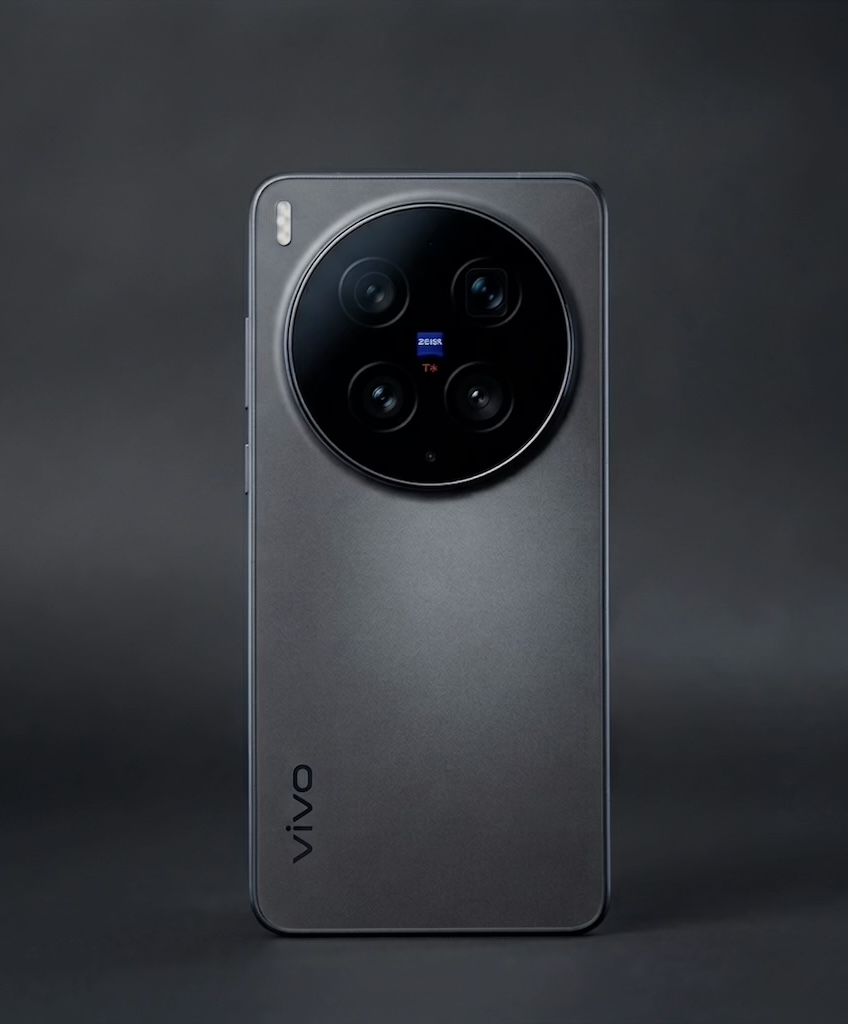
- Black model
- Developer: Vivo
- Manufacturer: Vivo
- Type: Smartphone
- Series: Vivo X
- First released: China: 3 April 2026; 5 months ago
- Availability by region: Selected international markets: 24 April 2026; 4 months ago India: 6 May 2026; 4 months ago
- Predecessor: Vivo X200 Ultra
- Related: Vivo X300 Pro
- Form factor: Slate
- Colors: Black, green, silver and white (market-dependent)
- Dimensions: 162.98 mm × 76.81 mm × 8.19 mm (6.417 in × 3.024 in × 0.322 in) (black); 162.98 mm × 76.81 mm × 8.49 mm (6.417 in × 3.024 in × 0.334 in) (other colours)
- Weight: 232 g (8.2 oz) (black); 237 g (8.4 oz) (other colours)
- Operating system: Android 16 with OriginOS 6
- System-on-chip: Qualcomm Snapdragon 8 Elite Gen 5
- GPU: Adreno 840
- Memory: 12 or 16 GB LPDDR5X
- Storage: 256 GB, 512 GB or 1 TB UFS 4.1
- Removable storage: None
- SIM: Dual nano-SIM eSIM on international models
- Battery: 6,600 mAh typical (6,395 mAh rated), non-removable
- Charging: 100 W wired 40 W wireless
- Rear camera: 200 MP Sony LYT-901, f/1.85, 35 mm equivalent (wide), OIS; 200 MP Samsung HP0, f/2.67, 85 mm equivalent (periscope telephoto), 3.7× optical zoom, OIS; 50 MP Sony LYT-818, f/2.0, 14 mm equivalent (ultrawide), OIS; 5 MP multispectral colour sensor Video: 8K at 30 fps; 4K at up to 120 fps, 10-bit Log and Dolby Vision
- Front camera: 50 MP, f/2.45, autofocus Video: 4K at up to 60 fps
- Display: 6.82 in (173 mm) LTPO AMOLED, 3168 × 1440 pixels (510 ppi), 1–144 Hz, HDR10+, Dolby Vision
- Sound: Stereo speakers Four microphones
- Connectivity: Bluetooth, infrared, NFC, USB-C 3.2 Gen 2, Wi-Fi 7
- Water resistance: IP68 (immersion up to 1.5 m (4.9 ft) for 30 minutes); IP69 (high-pressure water jets)
- Other: Ultrasonic in-display fingerprint reader Vivo VS1+ imaging co-processor
- Website: www.vivo.com/en/products/x300-ultra

The Vivo X300 Ultra is a flagship Android-based smartphone developed and manufactured by Vivo. Its camera system was co-engineered with Zeiss. It was announced in China on 30 March 2026 and released there on 3 April as part of the Vivo X300 series. Sales in the first international markets began on 24 April. The highest-specification model in the series, it succeeds the Vivo X200 Ultra and is the first X-series Ultra model to receive an official international release.

The rear camera system consists of 200-megapixel main and periscope telephoto cameras, a 50-megapixel ultrawide camera and a multispectral colour sensor. Each of the three photographic cameras has optical image stabilisation. The main camera uses a 35 mm-equivalent lens, which gives it a narrower field of view than the lenses commonly used for smartphone main cameras. The accessory range includes 200 mm and 400 mm telephoto extenders, a battery grip and a SmallRig video cage.

== History and release ==
Vivo previewed the X300 Ultra at Mobile World Congress in Barcelona on 2 March 2026. The demonstration disclosed its dual 200-megapixel cameras, 400 mm telephoto attachment and SmallRig cage, and confirmed that an Ultra model would be offered outside China for the first time. The formal Chinese launch followed on 30 March. Prices began at CN¥6,999 for the 12 GB RAM and 256 GB storage model and reached CN¥8,999 for a satellite-communication edition with 16 GB of RAM and 1 TB of storage. Retail sales in China began on 3 April.

Vivo announced the international launch on 15 April, with sales in the first overseas markets beginning on 24 April. Distribution covered parts of continental Europe, Asia, the Middle East and Latin America. The United Kingdom and United States were excluded from the official launch plan.

A European model with 16 GB of RAM and 1 TB of storage was listed at €1,999. Spanish online sales began on 24 April, followed by retail availability on 4 May. Vivo released the phone in India on 6 May for ₹159,999 in a 16 GB and 512 GB configuration.

== Design ==
The X300 Ultra has a flat 6.82-inch display, an aluminium frame and a circular rear camera unit. The black version is 8.19 mm (0.322 in) thick and weighs 232 g (8.2 oz). Versions with a glass rear panel are 8.49 mm (0.334 in) thick and weigh 237 g (8.4 oz). Colour names varied by market. The international range comprised Volcano Black, Steppe Green and Alpine White. Indian models were called Eclipse Black and Victory Green. The Chinese range included black, green and silver finishes.

The phone carries IP68 and IP69 ratings under IEC 60529. Vivo's IP68 test covered immersion in 1.5 m (4.9 ft) of fresh water for 30 minutes, and the IP69 test used high-pressure water jets.

== Specifications ==
=== Hardware and display ===
The X300 Ultra uses Qualcomm's Snapdragon 8 Elite Gen 5 system on a chip with an Adreno 840 graphics processor. Chinese models were sold with 12 or 16 GB of LPDDR5X memory and 256 GB, 512 GB or 1 TB of UFS 4.1 storage. International configurations have 16 GB of memory and either 512 GB or 1 TB of storage. A 5,800 mm² vapour chamber transfers heat away from the processor and imaging hardware.

Connectivity includes Wi-Fi 7, NFC, infrared and USB 3.2 Gen 2 at up to 10 Gbit/s. International models support an eSIM alongside two nano-SIM slots. An ultrasonic fingerprint reader is built into the display.

The 6.82-inch LTPO AMOLED display has a 3168 × 1440 resolution and an adaptive refresh rate between 1 and 144 Hz. The 144 Hz mode is limited to compatible software. Vivo specifies 4,500 nits as the local peak brightness under a test covering one per cent of the screen. The display supports HDR10+, HDR Vivid and Dolby Vision.

The single-cell silicon-carbon battery has a typical capacity of 6,600 mAh and a rated capacity of 6,395 mAh. It supports 100 W wired and 40 W wireless charging.

=== Cameras ===
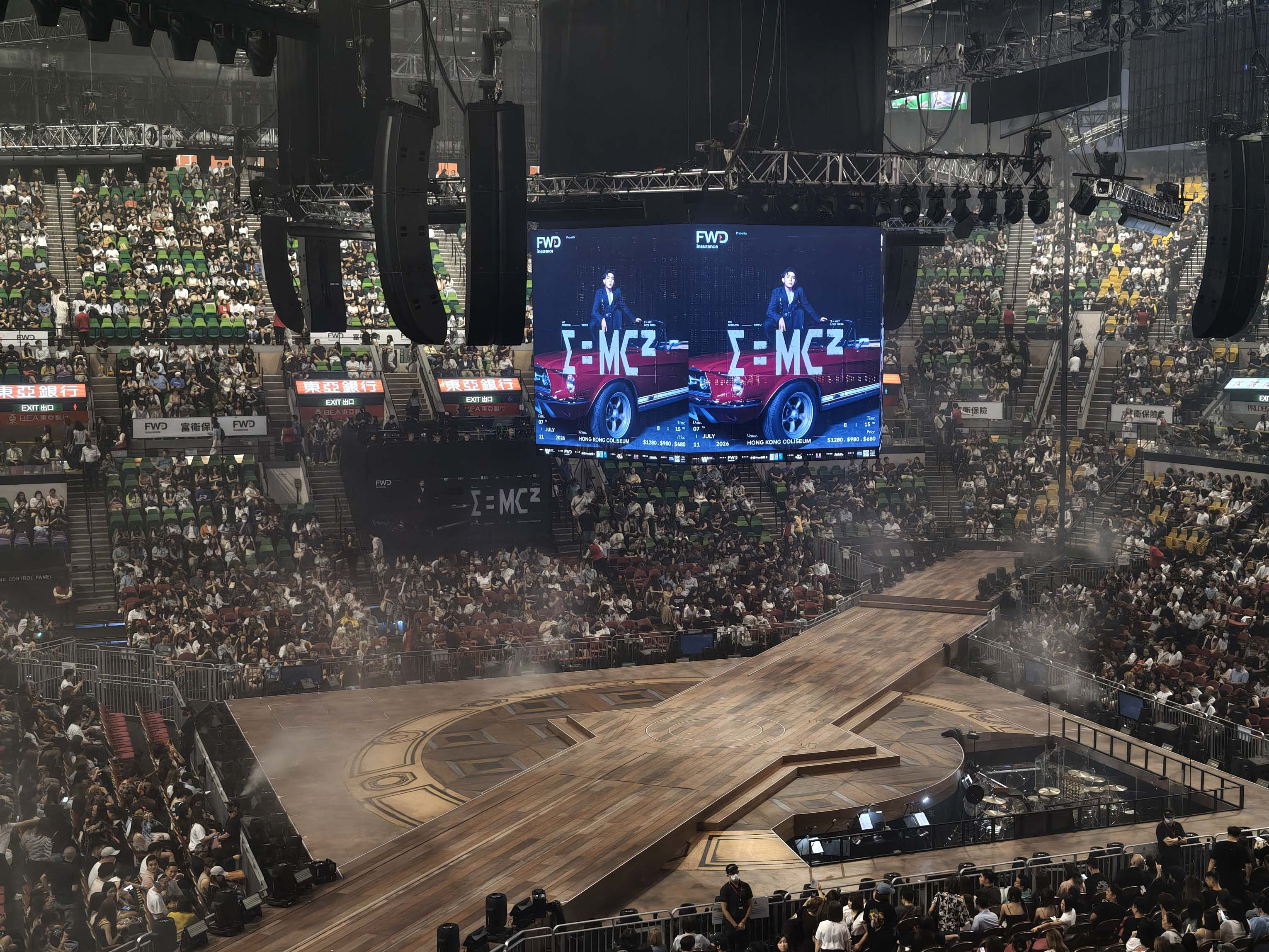
A concert stage photographed with the phone's 35 mm-equivalent main camera

The main camera uses a 200-megapixel Sony LYT-901 sensor measuring 1/1.12 inch and a 35 mm-equivalent f/1.85 lens. Its longer focal length produces a tighter standard view than the approximately 24 mm-equivalent lenses found on many other phones. The second 200-megapixel camera pairs a 1/1.4-inch Samsung HP0 sensor with an 85 mm-equivalent periscope lens. Vivo markets this camera as having 3.7× optical zoom. A 50-megapixel Sony LYT-818 sensor with a 14 mm-equivalent lens supplies the ultrawide view. All three lenses use Zeiss T* coatings and optical image stabilisation.

A separate 5-megapixel, 12-channel sensor measures ambient colour and feeds that information into the image-processing system. The VS1+ imaging co-processor handles RAW data before it reaches the main processor. Vivo's camera application provides JPEG, RAW and SuperRAW capture, along with Zeiss portrait simulations and adjustable colour profiles.

The three rear cameras can record 4K video at 120 frames per second with optical stabilisation. The 50-megapixel front camera has autofocus and records 4K video at 60 frames per second. Recording options for the rear system include 10-bit Log using the APV 4:2:2 codec, Dolby Vision, ACES colour management and previewing with a user-supplied three-dimensional lookup table. Rear video modes include 8K at 30 frames per second. Four microphones support directional recording presets intended for speech, concerts and sporting events.

Two Zeiss-branded telephoto extenders attach over the 85 mm camera. The 2.35× version gives a 200 mm-equivalent optical focal length and weighs 153 g (5.4 oz). The 4.7× version gives a 400 mm-equivalent focal length and weighs 248 g (8.7 oz). Vivo offered the lenses separately and as part of a Photographer Kit with an imaging grip. The grip adds physical controls, a tripod socket and a 2,300 mAh battery. A video cage developed with SmallRig provides mounting points for handles, microphones, lights and a cooling fan.

=== Software ===
The phone shipped with Android 16 and OriginOS 6. The X300 and X300 Pro had introduced OriginOS internationally in October 2025, replacing Funtouch OS on Vivo's global flagship models.

International X300 Ultra models include Google Mobile Services and the Google Play store. Vivo promised five major operating-system upgrades and seven years of security maintenance. OriginOS supports cross-device file transfer with iPhones, iPads and Windows or macOS computers.

== Reception ==
The camera system received favourable reviews. Android Central placed the X300 Ultra at the top of the camera phones it had tested in 2026, citing image consistency among the three rear cameras and the expanded video modes. PetaPixel found the focal lengths, RAW controls and colour adjustments useful for different styles of photography. Its reviewer initially encountered uneven dynamic range and colour. Two firmware updates improved those areas during the review period. Digital Camera World praised stabilisation, manual video controls and output from each rear camera. The size of the camera housing and the amount of preinstalled software reduced its assessment.

DXOMARK gave the camera an overall score of 170, ranking it third in the site's global smartphone camera table on 1 June 2026. Its photo and video scores were 174 and 162. The laboratory noted accurate portraits and strong detail from the ultrawide and telephoto cameras, with occasional autofocus errors, noise and unnatural textures in difficult low-light scenes. In a direct comparison with the Oppo Find X9 Ultra, Engadget preferred Vivo's ultrawide camera and video stabilisation. The publication regarded Oppo's built-in 10× camera as a more flexible arrangement for long-range still photography.

The telephoto attachments drew qualified praise. TechRadar found that the two extenders added useful reach for travel and street photography and produced images that remained usable at their stated focal lengths. Android Authority obtained detailed photographs at 400 mm and 800 mm with the larger extender. Its practical limitations included a minimum focusing distance of roughly four to five metres, a top-heavy grip and inconsistent processing at 1,600 mm and 3,200 mm digital settings.

Reviews of the display and battery life were positive. PhoneArena measured 3,300 nits of brightness with 20 per cent of the screen illuminated. Android Authority recorded seven to eight hours of active screen use and generally charged the phone every other day. Its stress tests showed thermal throttling during prolonged graphics workloads. Notebookcheck recorded high surface temperatures and reduced sustained performance. Its review rated the display, camera versatility and battery endurance favourably.

Stuff commended general performance, charging and battery life. It identified software clutter and regional availability as the principal obstacles. HardwareZone objected to advertising notifications and folders containing promoted app links in OriginOS on a phone at this price. Android Authority listed the absence of an official United States release and the cost of the optional camera kit among its other reservations.
