= HD DVD =

Obsolete optical disc format

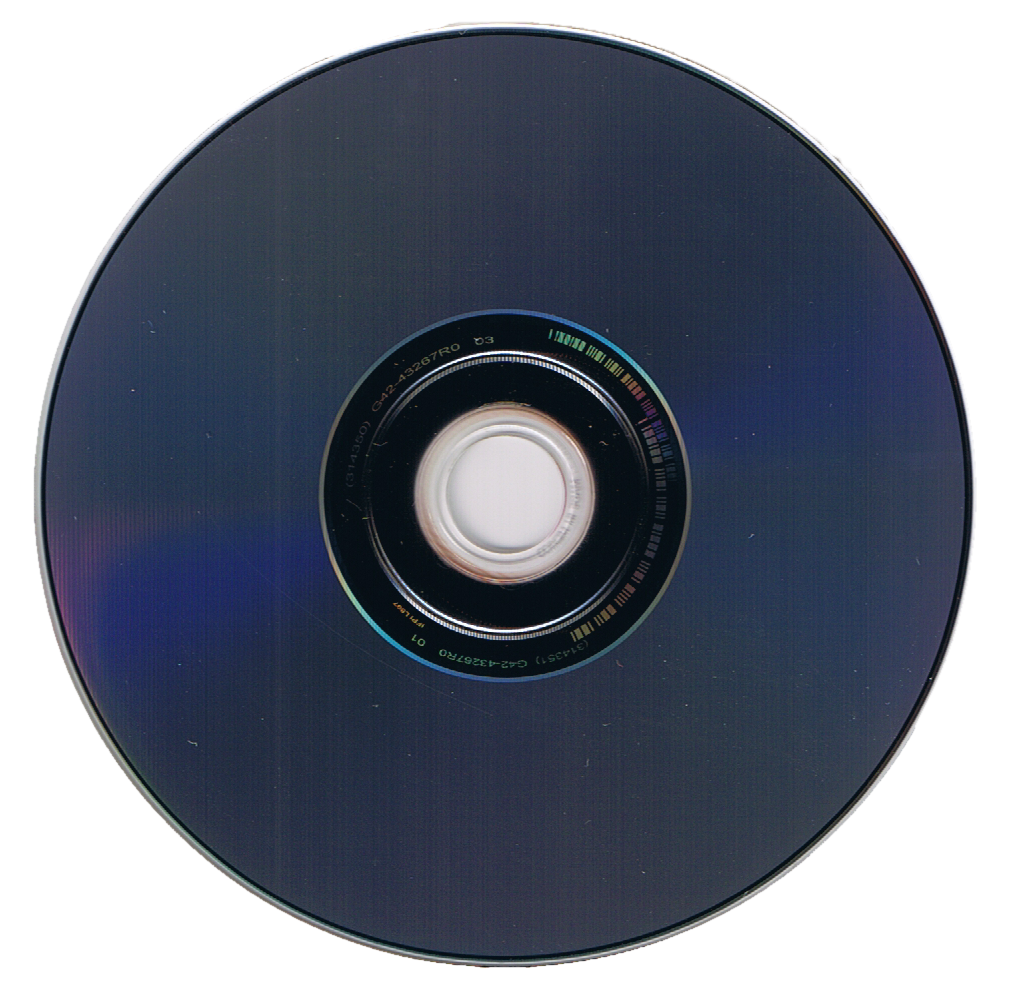
- Data side of an HD DVD
- Media type: High-density optical disc
- Encoding: VC-1, H.264, and MPEG-2
- Capacity: 15 GB (single layer); 30 GB (dual layer)
- Read mechanism: 405 nm laser: 1× @ 36 Mbit/s & 2× @ 72 Mbit/s
- Write mechanism: 405 nm laser: 1× @ 36 Mbit/s & 2× @ 72 Mbit/s
- Developed by: Toshiba; DVD Forum
- Usage: Data storage, 1080p high-definition video
- Extended from: DVD, DVD-Video
- Released: March 31, 2006
- Discontinued: March 28, 2008 (1 year, 11 months and 28 days)

HD DVD (short for High Density Digital Versatile Disc) is an obsolete high-density optical disc format for storing data and playback of high-definition video. Supported principally by Toshiba, HD DVD was envisioned to be the successor to the standard DVD format, but lost out to Blu-ray, which was supported by Sony and others.

HD DVD employed a blue laser with a shorter wavelength (with the exception of the 3× DVD and HD REC variants), and it stored about 3.2 times as much data per layer as its predecessor (maximum capacity: 15 GB per layer compared to 4.7 GB per layer on a DVD). The format was commercially released in 2006 and fought a protracted format war with its rival, the Blu-ray Disc. Compared to the Blu-ray Disc, the HD DVD was released earlier by a quarter year, featured a lower capacity per layer (compared to 25 GB of Blu-ray), but saved manufacturing costs by allowing existing DVD manufacturing equipment to be repurposed with minimal modifications, and movie playback was not restricted through region codes.

On 19 February 2008, Toshiba abandoned the format, announcing it would no longer manufacture HD DVD players and drives. The HD DVD Promotion Group was dissolved on March 28, 2008.

The HD DVD physical disc specifications (but not the codecs) were used as the basis for the China Blue High-definition Disc (CBHD) formerly called CH-DVD.

Besides recordable and rewritable variants, an HD DVD-RAM variant was proposed as the successor to the DVD-RAM and specifications for it were developed, but the format never reached the market.

== History ==
In the late 1990s, commercial HDTV sets started to enter a larger market, but there was no inexpensive way to record or play back HD content. JVC's D-VHS and Sony's HDCAM formats could store that amount of data, but were neither popular nor well-known. It was known that using lasers with shorter wavelengths would yield optical storage with higher density. Shuji Nakamura invented practical blue laser diodes, but a lengthy patent lawsuit delayed commercial introduction.

=== Origins and competition from Blu-ray Disc ===
Sony started two projects applying the new diodes: UDO (Ultra Density Optical) and DVR Blue together with Philips, a format of rewritable discs which would eventually become Blu-ray Disc (more specifically, BD-RE) and later on with Pioneer a format of read only discs (BD-ROM). The two formats share several technologies (such as the AV codecs and the laser diode). In February 2002, the project was officially announced as Blu-ray Disc, and the Blu-ray Disc Association was founded by the nine initial members.

The DVD Forum (chaired by Sony) was deeply split over whether or not to go with the more expensive blue lasers. Although today's Blu-ray Discs appear virtually identical to a standard DVD, when the Blu-ray Discs were initially developed they required a protective caddy to avoid mis-handling by the consumer (early CD-Rs also featured a protective caddy for the same purpose.) The Blu-ray Disc prototype's caddy was both expensive and physically different from DVD, posing several problems. In March 2002, the forum voted to approve a proposal endorsed by Warner Bros. and other motion picture studios that involved compressing HD content onto dual-layer DVD-9 discs. In spite of this decision, the DVD Forum's Steering Committee announced in April that it was pursuing its own blue-laser high-definition solution. In August, Toshiba and NEC announced their competing standard Advanced Optical Disc. It was adopted by the DVD forum and renamed to HD DVD the next year.

The HD DVD Promotion Group was a group of manufacturers and media studios formed to exchange thoughts and ideas to help promote the format worldwide. Its members comprised Toshiba as the Chair Company and Secretary, Memory-Tech Corporation and NEC as vice-chair companies, and Sanyo Electric as Auditors; There were 61 general members and 72 associate members in total. The HD DVD promotion group was officially dissolved on March 28, 2008, following Toshiba's announcement on 19 February 2008, that it would no longer develop or manufacture HD DVD players and drives.

=== Attempts to avoid a format war ===
Much like the videotape format war between VHS and Betamax, HD DVD was competing with a rival format, Blu-ray Disc.

In an attempt to avoid a costly format war, the Blu-ray Disc Association and DVD Forum attempted to negotiate a compromise in early 2005. One of the issues was that Blu-ray Disc companies wanted to use a Java-based platform for interactivity (BD-J based on Sun Microsystems' Java TV standards), while HD DVD companies wanted to use Microsoft's "iHD" (which became HDi). Another problem was the physical formats of the discs themselves. The negotiations proceeded slowly and ultimately stalled.

On August 22, 2005, the Blu-ray Disc Association and DVD Forum announced that the negotiations to unify their standards had failed. Rumors surfaced that talks had stalled; publicly, the same reasons of physical format incompatibility were cited. By the end of September that year, Microsoft and Intel jointly announced their support for HD DVD.

Hewlett-Packard attempted to broker a compromise between the Blu-ray Disc Association and Microsoft by demanding that Blu-ray Disc use Microsoft's HDi instead of BD-J and threatening to support HD DVD instead. The Blu-ray Disc Association did not agree to HP's demands.

=== Launch ===
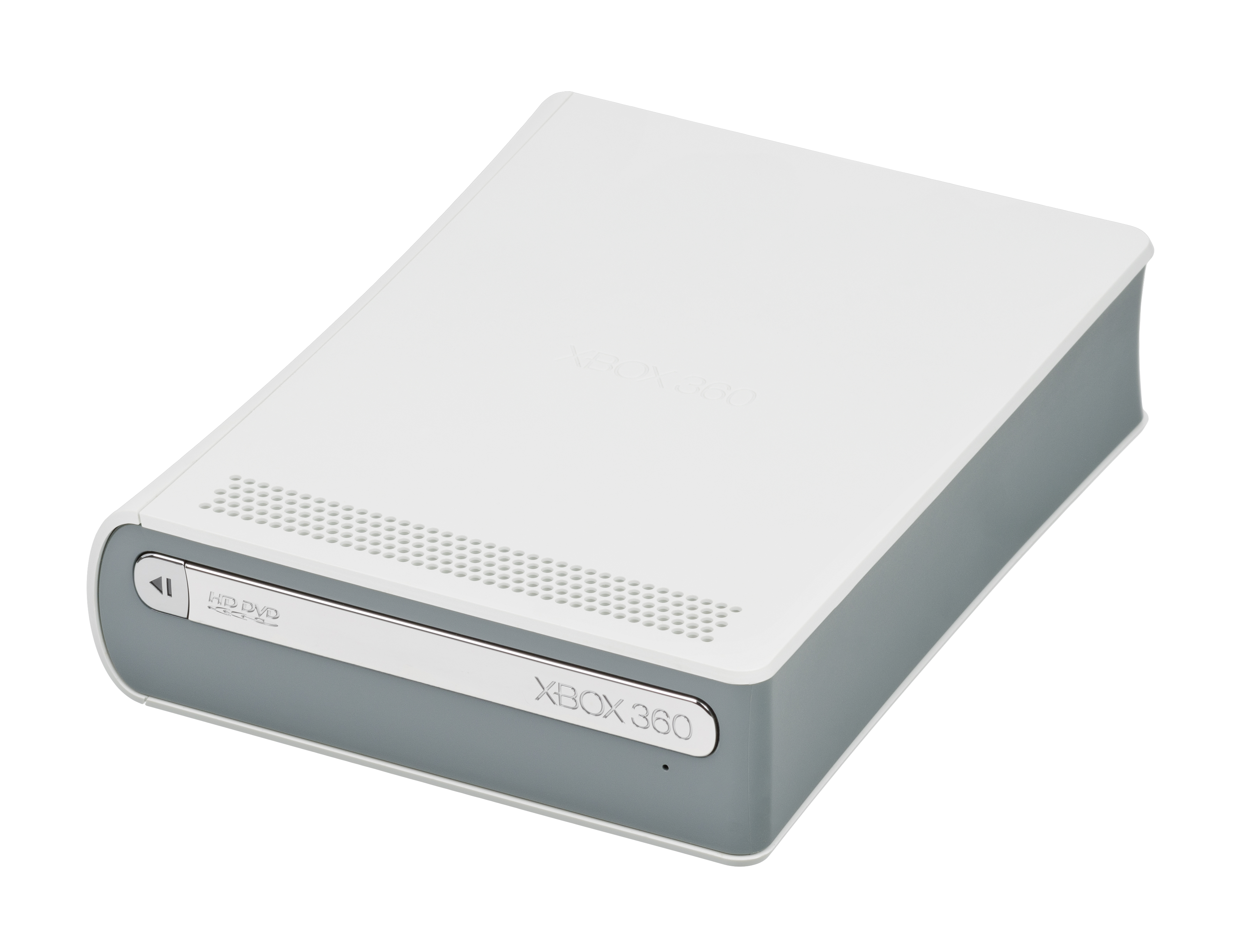
In November 2006, Microsoft released a HD DVD player for their Xbox 360 game console for $199. It came packaged with King Kong and could only play movies.

On March 31, 2006, Toshiba released their first consumer-based HD DVD player in Japan at ¥110,000 (US$934). HD DVD was released in the United States on 18 April 2006, with players priced at $499 and $799.

The first HD DVD titles were released on 18 April 2006. They were The Last Samurai, Million Dollar Baby, and The Phantom of the Opera by Warner Home Video and Serenity by Universal Studios. The first independent HD film released on HD DVD was One Six Right.

=== Sales developments ===
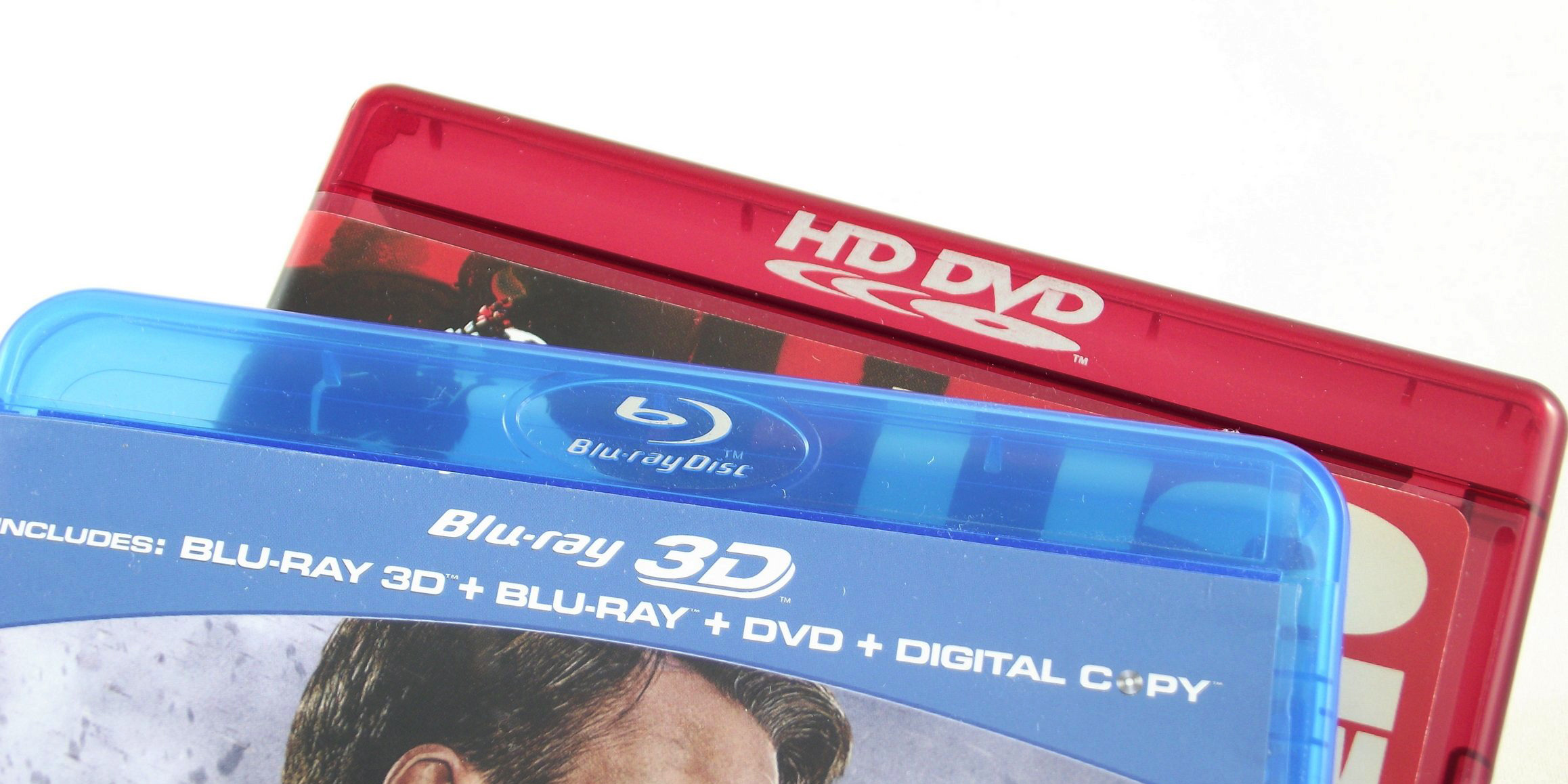
Although HD DVD and Blu-ray used near-identical translucent keep cases for most pre-recorded releases, they were normally coloured red for the former and blue for the latter.

In December 2006 Toshiba reported that roughly 120,000 Toshiba branded HD DVD players had been sold in the United States, along with 150,000 HD DVD add-on units for the Xbox 360.

On April 17, 2007, one year after the first HD DVD titles were released, the HD DVD group reported that they had sold 100,000 dedicated HD DVD units in the United States.

In the middle of 2007, the first HD DVD recorders were released in Japan.

In November 2007, the Toshiba HD-A2 was the first high-definition player to be sold at a sale price of less than $100. This was done through several major retailers to make room for the new HD-A3 models. These closeout sales lasted less than a day each due to both limited quantities and high demand at that price point. In the same month, the HD DVD promotion group announced that 750,000 HD DVD players had been sold, which included stand-alone players and the Xbox 360 add-on.

In January 2008 Toshiba announced that close to one million dedicated HD DVD players had been sold.

As of June 24, 2008, 475 HD DVD titles had been released in the US. As of April 29, 2008, 236 HD DVD titles had been released in Japan. Approximately 232 were released in the UK.

=== Decline ===
On January 4, 2008, citing consumer confusion and indifference as a reason for lackluster high-definition software sales, Warner Bros. publicly announced it would stop supporting HD DVD by June 2008, and the company would release HD titles only on Blu-ray Disc. This was followed by news of Netflix phasing out support for the format, and Best Buy's decision to recommend Blu-ray Disc over HD DVD in its retail locations and to remove HD DVD players as part of its ongoing "HDTV advantage" promotion. Finally, retailer Wal-Mart announced that it would be supporting only Blu-ray Disc by June 2008.

On 19 February 2008, Toshiba announced plans to discontinue development, marketing and manufacturing of HD DVD players while still providing product support and after-sale service to consumers of the format (including firmware updates), effectively making the platform obsolete. The company cited "recent major changes in the market". Shipments of HD DVD machines to retailers were reduced and eventually stopped by the end of March 2008. Toshiba later revealed that they lost about $986 million on the format's failure.

=== End of releases ===
The final HD DVD major-studio releases in the United States were Paramount's Into the Wild, Warner's P.S. I Love You and Twister, on May 27, 2008. In June, the final HD DVD, Freedom: 6, was released by Bandai Visual, which acknowledged the demise of HD DVD, but stated that it wanted to complete the release of the seven-part Freedom Project, of which six parts had been released. The seventh part, due for August 2008, never saw a release. Disco Pigs was announced but postponed, with no new date announced for release. Pan's Labyrinth is also notable as New Line Cinema's only film to be released on HD DVD, as the studio quickly shifted to Blu-ray.

Death Proof was released on HD DVD format as a special-release steelbook by Senator Films in Germany on December 15, 2008.

On April 3, 2010, Engadget reported that Anthem Films would release the film Deadlands 2: Trapped on HD DVD in a limited run of 500 copies. This eventually happened in the form of HD DVD-Rs. Deadlands: The Rising, announced on September 5, 2010, was released on HD DVD in limited numbers. As with the previously released Deadlands 2: Trapped, the film was burned on HD DVD-R disc.

=== Warner HD-DVD to Blu-ray (BDMV) Disc replacements in the U.S.A. ===
In mid-2009, Warner offered to replace any HD DVD Warner home video release with a Blu-ray Disc equivalent for $4.95, plus $6.95 shipping to the contiguous United States or $8.95 to Alaska, Hawaii or Puerto Rico. The deal required the HD DVD's original sleeve art to be returned to Warner as proof of purchase. The turnaround time for processing was approximately two weeks. Multi-disc sets were exchangeable at a discount, such as $14.95 for the five-disc Blade Runner release rather than $24.75. No exchanges were offered to customers outside the United States.

== Capacity ==
An HD DVD has a capacity of 15,076,554,752 bytes. A dual-layer HD DVD (HD DVD+R/+RW DL or /DVD-R/-RW DL) can store 33,393,473,536 bytes. This capacity is used by the file contents and a small part is used by the file system overhead and by file names and folder names. The file structure on an HD DVD-Video would start at the VIDEO and AUDIO folders on a HD DVD-Video disc. This would be the case for HD DVD-Video regular (Single layer (SL))/HD DVD-Video DL (Dual layer).

== Standalone players ==
Name	Make	Type	Date of release	Max Resolution
HD-E1	Toshiba	HD-DVD/DVD player	15 October 2006, UK Only	1080i
HD-EP10	Toshiba	HD-DVD/DVD player	8 June 2007, UK Only	1080p
HD-EP30	Toshiba	HD-DVD/DVD player	5 November 2007, UK Only	1080p
HD-EP35	Toshiba	HD-DVD/DVD player	19 November 2007, UK Only	1080p
HD-XE1	Toshiba	HD-DVD/DVD player	15 October 2006, UK Only	1080p
HD-A1	Toshiba	HD-DVD/DVD player	18 April 2006	1080i
HD-XF2	Toshiba	HD-DVD/DVD player	2007	1080i
HD-XA1	Toshiba	HD-DVD/DVD player	18 April 2006	1080i
HDV5000	RCA	HD-DVD/DVD player	June 2006	1080i
HD-D1	Toshiba	HD-DVD/DVD player	2006	1080i
HD-D2	Toshiba	HD-DVD/DVD player		1080i
HD-A2 (also known as HD-E1)	Toshiba	HD-DVD/DVD player	2006 Q4	1080i
HD-A20	Toshiba	HD-DVD/DVD player	7 January 2007	1080p
HD-XA2	Toshiba	HD-DVD/DVD player	2006 Q4	1080p
HD-D3	Toshiba	HD-DVD/DVD player	November 2007	1080i
HD-A3	Toshiba	HD-DVD/DVD player	November 2007	1080i
HD-A30	Toshiba	HD-DVD/DVD player	September 2007	1080p
HD-A35	Toshiba	HD-DVD/DVD player	October 2007	1080p
VARDIA RD-A600	Toshiba	HD DVD/Regular DVD/HDD-based DVR	June 2007, Japan Only	1080p
VARDIA RD-A301	Toshiba	HD DVD/Regular DVD/HDD-based DVR	December 2007, Japan Only	1080i
VARDIA RD-A300	Toshiba	HD DVD/Regular DVD/HDD-based DVR	June 2007, Japan Only	1080p
VARDIA RD-A1	Toshiba	HD DVD/Regular DVD/HDD-based DVR	July 2006, Japan Only	1080p
DV-HD805	Onkyo	HD-DVD/DVD player	Fall 2007	1080p
DHS-8.8	Integra	HD-DVD/DVD player	Winter 2007	1080p
SHD7000	Venturer	HD-DVD/DVD player	End of 2007	1080i
SHD7001	Venturer	HD-DVD/DVD player	UK Only	1080i
SHD7500	Venturer	HD-DVD/DVD player	Cancelled	
BH100	LG	HD DVD/Blu-ray combo player	7 January 2007	1080p
BH200	LG	HD DVD/Blu-ray combo player	October 2007	1080p
BD-UP5000	Samsung	HD DVD/Blu-ray combo player		1080p
BD-UP5500	Samsung	HD DVD/Blu-ray combo player	Cancelled	1080p

== Computer peripherals ==
=== Internal drives ===
Name	Make	Type	Date of release	Sample Mfr Mo & Yr
HR-0205T	Asus	HD DVD-ROM drive	2008-Jan-01	
HDV-ROM2.4FB	Buffalo Technology	PC drive	2006-Oct-10	
BRHC-6316FBS-BK	Buffalo Technology	Internal Blu-ray Writer, HD DVD Reader	2008-Apr	
BRD-SH6B	I-O Data	Internal DVD Writer, Blu-ray & HD DVD Reader	2008-Aug-06	
GGC-H20L	LG	Internal DVD Writer, Blu-ray & HD DVD Reader (with LightScribe)		Jul-2008
GGC-H20N	LG	Internal DVD Writer, Blu-ray & HD DVD Reader (without LightScribe)		
GGW-H10NI	LG	Internal Blu-ray Writer, HD DVD Reader		
GGW-H20L	LG	Internal Blu-ray Writer, HD DVD Reader (with LightScribe)		Jul-2008
GGW-H20N	LG	Internal Blu-ray Writer, HD DVD Reader (without LightScribe)		
HR-1100A	NEC	Internal HD DVD-ROM drive (OEM usage only)		
PX-B300SA	Plextor	Internal DVD Writer, Blu-ray & HD DVD Reader		
PX-B920SA	Plextor	Internal Blu-ray Writer, HD DVD Reader	2008-Mar	
SD-H802A	Toshiba	HD DVD-ROM drive [IDE/PATA Interface]		2008-Jan
SD-H902A	Toshiba	HD DVD Writer PC drive		
SD-H903A	Toshiba	HD DVD Writer PC drive		

=== Notebook drives ===
Name	Make	Type	Date of release
TS-L802A	Toshiba	Slim HD DVD Reader + DVD Writer Combo PC drive (p/n G8CC0003172v P000480620	
SD-L802B	Toshiba	Slim HD DVD Reader + DVD Writer Combo PC drive (OEM usage only)	
SD-L803A	Toshiba	Slim HD DVD Reader + DVD Writer Combo PC drive (OEM usage only)	December 2007
SD-L902A	Toshiba	Slim HD DVD Writer PC drive HD DVD-R, HD DVD-R DL (OEM usage only) (OEM p/n P000486270 Used in the Qosmio PQG40A-00Y014	Mfr'd May 2007 - Oct 2007
SD-L912A	Toshiba	Slim HD DVD-ReWritable Drive. HD DVD-RW and HD DVD-R DL writer. (Used optionally in the Qosmio G40 and standard in the G45-AV690)	

=== External drives ===
Name	Make	Type	Date of release
ZEBRA	Addonics	External Blu-ray Disc & DVD Writer, HD DVD Reader	November 2008
BRHC-6316U2	Buffalo Technology	External USB2.0 Blu-ray Disc Rewriter, HD DVD Reader	April 2008
hd100	HP	External HD DVD-ROM drive	
BRD-UXH6	I-O Data	External Blu-ray Disc Rewriter and HD DVD-ROM drive with USB 2.0	2008/8/6
BE06LU10	LG	External USB2.0 Blu-ray Disc Rewriter, HD DVD Reader	
BE06LU11	LG	External USB2.0 Blu-ray Disc Rewriter HD DVD reader capability only by aftermarket crossflashing.	
Xbox 360 HD DVD Player	Microsoft	External HD DVD-ROM/HD DVD-Video drive	November 2006
AluWRITER Blu-ray	One technologies	External USB2.0 Blu-ray Disc Rewriter, HD DVD Reader	September 2009
SW-5583/SW-5583T	OWC	External Blu-ray Disc & DVD Writer, HD DVD Reader	November 2008
PX-B920UF	Plextor	External Blu-ray Disc Rewriter and HD DVD-ROM drive with USB 2.0	October 2008
PA3530U-1HD1	Toshiba	External slim HD DVD ROM USB 2.0	

== Computers that shipped with HD DVD/DVD/CD or Blu-ray/HD DVD/CD/DVD drives ==
Name	Make	Type	Date of release
HP Pavilion PC series	HP	Desktop Computer (can be customised to include combo HD DVD-ROM/Blu-ray Disc-RW)	
Medion Akoya MD8828	Medion	Desktop Computer (supports both HD DVD and Blu-ray Disc)	16 November 2007
MSI GX600-08	MSI	Laptop Computer with HD DVD-ROM Drive	
MSI GX610	MSI	Laptop Computer with HD DVD-ROM Drive	
MSI GX710	MSI	Laptop Computer with HD DVD-ROM Drive	
Qosmio G30	Toshiba	Laptop Computer with HD DVD-ROM Drive	
Qosmio G35	Toshiba	Laptop Computer with HD DVD-ROM Drive	16 May 2006
Qosmio G40	Toshiba	Laptop Computer with HD DVD-R or HD DVD-RW drive	
Qosmio G45	Toshiba	Laptop Computer with HD DVD-R or HD DVD-RW drive	
Qosmio F40	Toshiba	Laptop Computer with HD DVD-R or HD DVD-RW drive	
Qosmio F45	Toshiba	Laptop Computer with HD DVD-ROM drive	
Dynabook TX/68E	Toshiba	Laptop Computer with HD DVD-ROM drive	
Polywell Minibox 780G	Polywell	PC Complete System (Internal Blu-ray Disc & DVD Writer, HD DVD Reader)	August 2008
Satellite X200 series	Toshiba	Laptop Computer with HD DVD-R drive	
Satellite P200 series	Toshiba	Laptop Computer with HD DVD-ROM drive	
Satellite A200 series	Toshiba	Laptop Computer with HD DVD-ROM drive	
HP Pavilion dv6500/6600t series	HP	Laptop Computer (optional HD DVD drive)	
HP Pavilion dv6700t series	HP	Laptop Computer (optional HD DVD-R or Blu-ray drive)	
HP Pavilion dv9000 series	HP	Laptop Computer (optional HD DVD-ROM drive)	
HP Pavilion dv9500/9600t series	HP	Laptop Computer (optional HD DVD-R drive)	
HP Pavilion dv9700t series	HP	Laptop Computer (optional HD DVD-R or Blu-ray drive)	
HP Pavilion HDX series	HP	Laptop Computer (optional HD DVD-ROM or Blu-ray drive)	26 July 2007
G2S	ASUS	Laptop Computer (supports both HD DVD and Blu-ray)	
Lamborghini VX2S	ASUS	Laptop Computer (optional HD DVD-ROM drive)	
W2W	ASUS	Laptop Computer (optional HD DVD-ROM drive)	
C-System E8200	C-System	PC Complete System (Internal BD & DVD Writer, HD DVD Reader)	June 2008
Shuttle XPC G5 6801M	Shuttle Inc.	Mini-PC Complete System (Internal Blu-ray Disc & DVD Writer, HD DVD Reader)	April 2008
Aspire 5110	Acer	Laptop Computer (standard HD DVD-ROM drive)	
Aspire 5710	Acer	Laptop Computer (standard HD DVD-ROM drive)	
Aspire 5720	Acer	Laptop Computer (standard HD DVD-ROM drive)	
Aspire 5920	Acer	Laptop Computer (standard HD DVD-ROM drive)	
Aspire 7720	Acer	Laptop Computer (standard HD DVD-ROM drive)	
Aspire 9510	Acer	Laptop Computer (standard HD DVD-ROM drive)	
Aspire 9520	Acer	Laptop Computer (standard HD DVD-ROM drive)	
Aspire 9810	Acer	Laptop Computer (standard HD DVD-ROM drive)	
Ferrari 5000	Acer	Laptop Computer (optional HD DVD-ROM drive)	
Predator	Acer	PC Complete System (Internal Blu-ray Disc & DVD Writer, HD DVD Reader)	June 2008
Pegasus series	Rock	Laptop Computer (standard HD DVD-ROM drive for all laptops)	
Xtreme series	Rock	Laptop Computer (standard HD DVD-ROM drive for all laptops)	
VidaBox MAX and VidaBox LUX	VidaBox	Home Theater PC with HD DVD/Blu-ray combo reader	
LifeStation HD	Passive Technologies	Home Theater PC with HD DVD/Blu-ray combo reader	2007
Mini HD:Hub	Kinetic	Home Theater PC (supports Blu-ray Disc/HD DVD-ROM & DVD-ReWriter, optional Blu-ray Disc Writer)	2009 UK Only
Home HD:Hub	Kinetic	Home Theater PC (supports Blu-ray Disc/HD DVD-ROM & DVD-ReWriter, optional Blu-ray Disc Writer)	2009 UK Only
X HD:Hub	Kinetic	Home Theater PC (supports Blu-ray Disc/HD DVD-ROM & DVD-ReWriter, optional Blu-ray Disc Writer)	2009 UK Only

Toshiba-branded HD DVD players use open source software such as Linux as GPL appear in the manuals.

== Technical specifications ==
The current specification books for HD DVD are listed at the DVD FLLC website.

=== Disc structure ===
HD DVD-ROM, HD DVD-R and HD DVD-RW have a single-layer capacity of 15 GB, and a dual-layer capacity of 30 GB. HD DVD-RAM has a single-layer capacity of 20 GB. Like the original DVD format, the data layer of an HD DVD is 0.6 mm below the surface to physically protect the data layer from damage. The numerical aperture of the optical pick-up head is 0.65, compared with 0.6 for DVD. All HD DVD players are backward compatible with DVD and CD.

Physical size	Single layer capacity	Dual layer capacity
12 cm (4.7 in), single sided	15 GB	30 GB
12 cm (4.7 in), double sided	30 GB	60 GB
8 cm (3.1 in), single sided	4.7 GB	8.5 GB
8 cm (3.1 in), double sided	9.4 GB	18.8 GB

=== Recording speed ===
Drive speed	Data rate		Write time for HD DVD (minutes)	
Drive speed	Mbit/s	MB/s	Single Layer	Dual Layer
1×	36	4.5	56	110
2×	72	9	28	55

=== File systems ===
As with previous optical disc formats, HD DVD supports several file systems, such as ISO 9660 and Universal Disk Format (UDF). All HD DVD titles use UDF version 2.5 as the file system. In this file system, multiplexed audio and video streams are stored in EVO container format.

=== Audio ===
The HD DVD format supports encoding in up to 24-bit/192 kHz for two channels, or up to eight channels of up to 24-bit/96 kHz encoding.

All HD DVD players are required to decode uncompressed linear PCM, Dolby Digital AC-3, Dolby Digital EX, DTS, Dolby Digital Plus E-AC-3 and Dolby TrueHD. A secondary soundtrack, if present, can be stored in any of the aforementioned formats, or in one of the HD DVD optional codecs: DTS-HD High Resolution Audio and DTS-HD Master Audio. For the highest-fidelity audio experience, HD DVD offers content-producers the choice of LPCM, Dolby TrueHD and DTS-HD Master Audio.

=== Video ===
HD DVD video can be encoded using VC-1, H.264/MPEG-4 AVC, or H.262/MPEG-2 Part 2. A wide variety of resolutions are supported, from low-resolution CIF, all SDTV resolutions supported by DVD-Video, and HDTV formats: 720p, 1080i, and 1080p. All studio-released movie titles have featured video in a 1080-line format, with companion supplements in 480i or 480p. The vast majority of releases were encoded with VC-1, and most of the remaining titles encoded with H.264/MPEG-4 AVC.

== Digital rights management ==
If a publisher wishes to restrict use of its HD DVD content, it may use the Advanced Access Content System (AACS) although this is not required for normal disc playback. AACS is a standard for content distribution and digital rights management. It is developed by AACS Licensing Administrator, LLC (AACS LA), a consortium that includes Disney, Intel, Microsoft, Panasonic, Warner Bros., IBM, Toshiba and Sony.

One of the additions over Content Scramble System (CSS), the content restriction system for DVDs, is that AACS allows content providers to revoke an individual player device model if its cryptographic keys have been compromised (meaning that it will not be able to decrypt subsequently released content). There is no Region Coding in the existing HD DVD specification, which means that titles from any country can be played in players in any other country.

Since appearing in devices in 2006, several successful attacks have been made on the format. The first known attack relied on the trusted client problem. In addition, decryption keys have been extracted from a weakly protected player (WinDVD). Notably, a Processing Key was found that could be used to decrypt all HD content that had been released at the time. The processing key was widely published on the Internet after it was found and the AACS LA sent multiple DMCA takedown notices with the aim of censoring it. This caused trouble on some sites that rely on user-submitted content, like Digg and Wikipedia, when administrators tried to remove any mentions of the key.

AACS has also been circumvented by SlySoft with their program AnyDVD HD, which allows users to watch HD DVD movies on non-HDCP-compliant PC hardware. SlySoft has stated that AnyDVD HD uses several different mechanisms to disable the encryption, and is not dependent on the use of a single compromised encryption key. Other AACS circumvention programs have become available, like DVDFab HD Decrypter.

== Interactive content ==
HD DVDs use Advanced Content to allow interactive content to be authored for discs. Microsoft's implementation of Advanced Content is the HDi Interactive Format, and "HDi" is frequently used to refer to the Advanced Content system. Advanced Content is based on web technologies such as HTML, XML, CSS, SMIL, and ECMAScript (JavaScript), so authoring in Advanced Content should be a fairly easy transition for web developers. No existing DVD authoring experience is required. In comparison, Blu-ray Disc content is authored using either a scripting environment (BDMV) or a Java-based platform (BD-J). DVD video discs use pre-rendered MPEG segments, selectable subtitle pictures, and simple programmatic navigation which is considerably more limited.

== Hardware ==
=== Compatibility ===
Backward compatibility is available with all HD DVD players, allowing users to have a single player to play all types of HD DVD, DVD and CD. There is also a hybrid HD DVD format which contains both DVD and HD DVD versions of the same movie on a single disc, providing a smooth transition for the studios in terms of publishing movies, and allowing consumers with only DVD players to still use the discs. DVD replication companies can continue using their current production equipment with only minor alterations when changing over to the format of HD DVD replication. Due to the structure of the single-lens optical head, both red and blue laser diodes can be used in smaller, more compact HD DVD players. However, HD DVD discs can't be played on standard DVD players.

==== General purpose computers ====
HD DVD drives can also be used with a desktop/laptop (notebook computer) or personal computer (PC (like a desktop or portable/luggable)) running Windows XP, Windows Vista, Mac OS X v10.5 "Leopard", and many varieties of Linux. Third-party player software for Windows and Linux have successfully played HD DVD titles using the add-on drive.

Released at the end of November 2006, the Microsoft HD DVD drive for the Xbox 360 game-console gives the Xbox 360 the ability to play HD DVD movies. The drive was announced with an MSRP of US$199 and includes a USB 2.0 cable for connection to the console. The first drives also included Peter Jackson's King Kong or Christopher Nolan's Batman Begins on HD DVD. The final "regular" for the drive was US$129.99 as of February 25, 2008. On February 23, 2008, Microsoft discontinued the Xbox 360 HD DVD player. On February 26, 2008, Microsoft "officially" announced that the Xbox 360 HD DVD add on drive would reflect a heavily discounted price down to $49.99.

=== Dual-compatibility drives ===
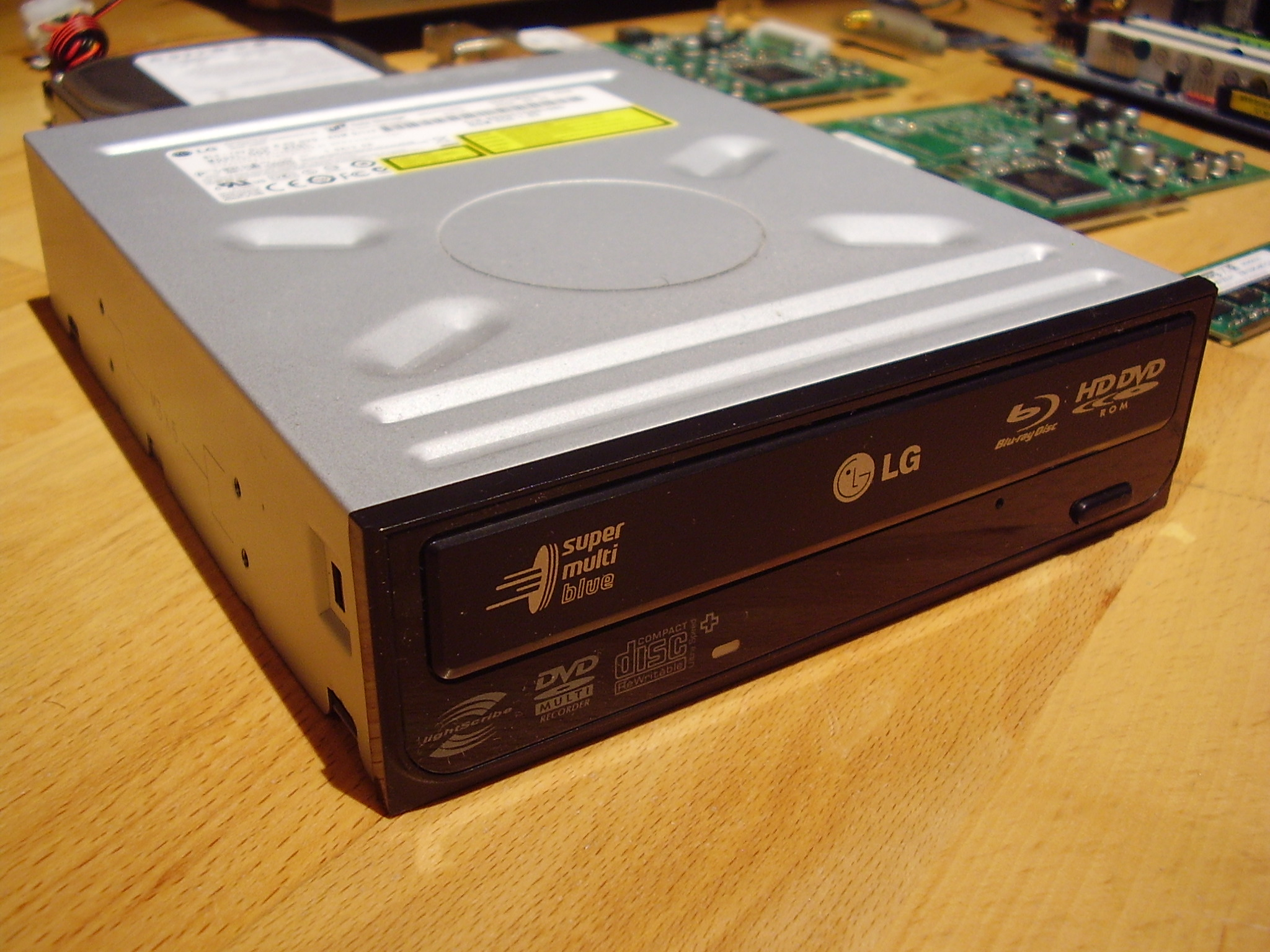
Internal optical disc drive from LG playing both, HD DVD and Blu-ray disks

In 2007, LG and Samsung released standalone consumer players that could read both HD DVD and Blu-ray Discs. (Note: In players and drives capable of reading both HD DVD and Blu-ray, the same blue violet laser is used for both formats.) The machines were sold at premium prices, but failed to sell in large quantities. In May 2008, both companies announced they would stop manufacturing dual-compatibility drives.

A few computer manufacturers (such as HP and Acer) sold computers with combination HD DVD/Blu-ray Disc drives. LG marketed a Blu-ray writer that also read HD DVD discs (but could not write to them).

== HD DVD/Blu-ray Disc comparison ==
Comparison of various optical storage media. Parameters: track pitch (p), pit width (w) and minimum length (l), and laser spot size (⌀) and wavelength (λ).

HD DVD competed primarily with Blu-ray Disc. Both formats were designed as successors to DVD, capable of higher quality video and audio playback, and of greater capacity when used to store video, audio, and computer data. Blu-ray Disc and HD DVD share most of the same methods of encoding media onto discs with each other, resulting in equivalent levels of audio and visual quality, but differ in other aspects such as interactive capabilities, internet integration, usage control and enforcement, and in which features were mandatory for players. The storage size also varies: A dual-layer HD DVD holds a maximum of 30 GB of data, while a dual-layer Blu-ray Disc carries 50 GB.

== Development ==
Even after finalizing the HD DVD standard, engineers continued developing the technology. A 51 GB triple-layer spec was approved at the DVD Forums 40th Steering Committee Meeting (held on November 15, 2007). No movies had been scheduled for this disc type, and Toshiba had declined to say whether the 51 GB disc was compatible with existing drives and players. Specification 2.0 Part 1 (Physical Specification) for triple layer HD DVD had been approved in November 2007.

At the CES 2007, Ritek revealed their high definition optical disc process that extended both competing high definition formats to ten layers, increasing capacity to 150 GB for HD DVD and 250 GB for Blu-ray Disc. A major obstacle to implementing this technology in either format (150 GB HD DVD will not be developed due to HD DVD's discontinuation) is that reader-writer technology available may not be able to support the additional data layers.

NEC, Broadcom, Horizon Semiconductors, and STMicroelectronics have separately developed a single chip/laser that can read both the HD DVD and the Blu-ray Disc standard. Broadcom and STMicroelectronics will be selling their dual-format single chip/laser solution to any OEM willing to develop a product based on the chip.

== Variants and media ==
=== HD DVD-R/-RW/-RAM ===
HD DVD-R is the writable disc variant of HD DVD, available with a single-layer capacity of 15 GB or a dual-layer capacity of 30 GB. Write speeds depend on drive speed, with a data rate of 36.55 Mbit/s (4.36 MB/s) and a recording time of 56 minutes for 1× media, and 73 Mbit/s (8.71 MB/s) and a recording time of 28 minutes for 2×.

The Toshiba SD-L902A for notebooks was one of the first available HD DVD writers, although it was not meant for retail. Burning HD DVD (including Dual Layer) with a 1× write speed, it could also burn DVDs and CDs. In a test of the SD-L902A by C't computer magazine with Verbatim discs, the written HD DVD-Rs suffered from high noise levels, as a result, the written discs could not be recognized by the external HD DVD drive of the Xbox 360, though they could be read back by the SD-L902A.

HD DVD-RW is the rewritable disc variant of HD DVD with equal storage capacity to an HD DVD-R. The primary advantage of HD DVD-RW over HD DVD-R is the ability to erase and rewrite to an HD DVD-RW disc, up to about 1,000 times before needing replacement, making them comparable with the CD-RW and DVD-RW standards. This is also of benefit if there are writing errors when recording data, as the disc is not ruined and can still store data by erasing the faulty data. The dual-layer variant was never released and the single-layer variant was, but it is among the rarest of optical media.

HD DVD-RAM was the proposed successor to DVD-RAM for random access on optical media using phase-change principals. It would hold 20 gigabytes per layer instead of 15 gigabytes for HD DVD-R, due to differences in recording methods used, yielding a higher density disc. This variant of HD DVD was never released.

=== DVD/HD DVD hybrid discs ===
There are two types of hybrid formats which contain standard DVD-Video format video for playback in regular DVD players, and HD DVD video for playback in high definition on HD DVD players. The Combo disc is a dual sided disc with one side DVD and the other HD DVD, each of which can have up to two layers. The Twin disc is a single sided disc that can have up to three layers, with up to two layers dedicated to either DVD or HD DVD. These hybrid discs make retail marketing and shelf space management easier. Another advantage is hardware cross-compatibility. The average consumer does not have to worry about whether or not they can play a hybrid DVD: any standard home DVD player can access the DVD-encoded content and any HD DVD player can access both the DVD- and HD DVD-encoded content.

=== HD DVD/Blu-ray Disc hybrid discs ===
Warner Bros. officially announced Total Hi Def (THD or Total HD) at CES 2007. THD hybrid discs were to support both HD DVD and Blu-ray Disc, with HD DVD on one side (up to two layers) and Blu-ray Disc on the other side (up to two layers). In November 2007, Warner Bros. cancelled THD's development.

=== 3× DVD ===
The HD DVD format also applies to current red laser DVDs; this type of disc is called "3× DVD", as it is capable of three times the bandwidth of regular DVD-Video.

3× DVDs are physically identical to normal DVDs. Although 3× DVDs provide the same high-definition content, their playback time is less. For example, an 8.5 GB DVD DL can hold about 90 minutes of 1080p video encoded with VC-1 or AVC at an average bitrate of 12 Mbit/s, which corresponds with the average length of Hollywood feature-films. If quality is compromised slightly, and good compression techniques are used, most feature films could be encoded with 3× DVD. Due to its much greater resolution, HD-Video also has significantly more redundant information than DVD which newer compression standards can encode more efficiently.

It is technically possible for consumers to create HD DVD compatible discs using low cost DVD-R or DVD+R media. At least one such guide exists. The 3× DVD is comparable to Blu-ray Disc BD5 and BD9 formats.

=== HD REC ===
HD Rec is an extension of the HD DVD format for recording HD content on regular red laser DVD-Rs/DVD-RWs using H.264/MPEG-4 AVC (MP4/MP4_AVC) compression. It was approved by the DVD Forum on September 12, 2007 It is comparable to Blu-ray Disc's AVCREC.

=== CBHD ===
The China Blue High-definition Disc (CBHD), a high-definition optical disc format, was based upon the HD DVD format. Like the HD DVD, CBHD discs have a capacity of 15 GB single-layer and 30 GB dual-layer and can use existing DVD production lines.

== See also ==
- 1080p, high-definition resolution supported by HD DVD and Blu-ray Disc.
- Advanced Interactivity Consortium
- Comparison of popular optical data-storage systems
- Dolby Digital Plus, one of the mandatory audio codecs for HD DVD hardware
- HD NVD
- High definition optical disc format war
- MUSE LD – an earlier optical disc which contained analog HDTV signals
- List of optical disc manufacturers
- HD DVD Standard Content authoring software in 2026 by a Reddit user. Authoring software for a Standard Content HD DVD with navigation features specific to finalized HD DVDs.

=== Alternative disc technologies ===
- 3D optical data storage – another next-generation technology
- AVCHD
- Blu-ray Disc
- Digital Multilayer Disk
- Enhanced Versatile Disc (EVD)
- Fluorescent Multilayer Disc
- Forward Versatile Disc (FVD)
- LS-R – a "layer selection" technology designed to allow large numbers of data layers in one disc.
- Professional Disc for DATA (PDD or ProDATA)
- Ultra Density Optical
- Versatile Multilayer Disc
