= Qosmio =

Laptop

Toshiba Qosmio

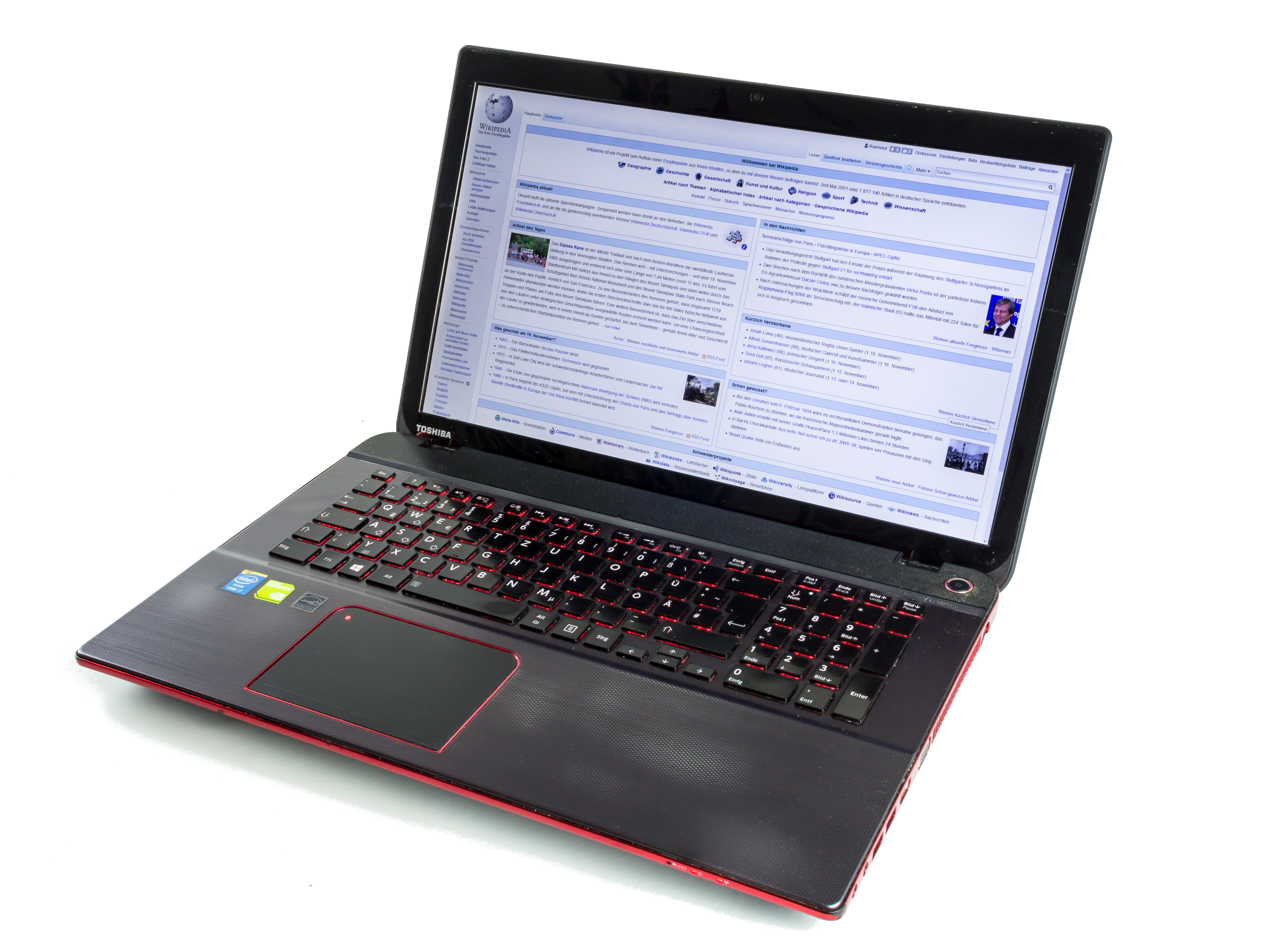
- Toshiba Qosmio X70-A displaying the Main Page of the German Wikipedia
- Developer: Toshiba
- Manufacturer: Toshiba
- Type: Desktop replacement laptop / Gaming laptop
- Released: July 25, 2004; 22 years ago
- Lifespan: 2004–2015
- Discontinued: 2015
- Operating system: Windows
- CPU: Intel, AMD
- Graphics: AMD, Nvidia
- Marketing target: Gaming
- Website: http://laptops.toshiba.com:80/laptops/qosmio at the Wayback Machine (archived November 8, 2009)

The Qosmio (KOS-mee-oh (Note: Known as Dynabook Qosmio (ダイナブック コスミオ, Dainabukku Kusomio) in Japan, stylized as dynabook Quosmio)) series was Toshiba's consumer-marketed line of high performance multimedia-oriented desktop replacement laptops. The first Qosmio laptop was released on July 25, 2004 as the E15-AV101 with a 1.7 GHz Intel Pentium M CPU, 512 megabytes of DDR SDRAM, and a 15-inch XGA 1024x768 screen. Toshiba's most powerful laptop has undergone many revisions, with focus shifting from high-end multimedia functionality to heavy gaming. The last line under the Qosmio name, the X70 series, was released in 2013, featuring an Intel Core i7 processor with up to 32 GB of DDR3 SDRAM and an Nvidia GeForce GTX 770M as well as a 17.3-inch Full HD display. The Qosmio G35-AV650 was the first production notebook to include an HD DVD-compatible drive.

== History ==
The Toshiba Qosmio G35-AV650 was the first production notebook made available with an HD DVD-compatible drive. The Qosmio G35 line also functioned as a Digital Video Recorder as it contains an integrated TV tuner.

Focus for the Qosmio had shifted from full-fledged multimedia to high-end gaming with high-quality graphics and audio. This can be seen in the first Qosmio, the E15-AV101, which offered a 1.7 GHz Intel Pentium M 735 CPU, 512 MB of DDR SDRAM, a 15-inch XGA 1024x768 screen, and an Nvidia GeForce FX Go5200 with 64 MB of dedicated DDR video memory, all of which were relatively powerful for the time. The X500 had an Intel Core i7 processor with up to 6 GB of DDR3 SDRAM as well as an 18.4 inch HD display powered by an Nvidia GeForce GTX 460M with 1.5 GB of GDDR5 video memory. These components, on the other hand, are on the high end of the spectrum in performance. This original model launched in 2004 with an international marketing campaign. The campaign was featured in every major publication, as well as an ambitious digital campaign, one of the first for a major laptop release at that time.

== Models ==
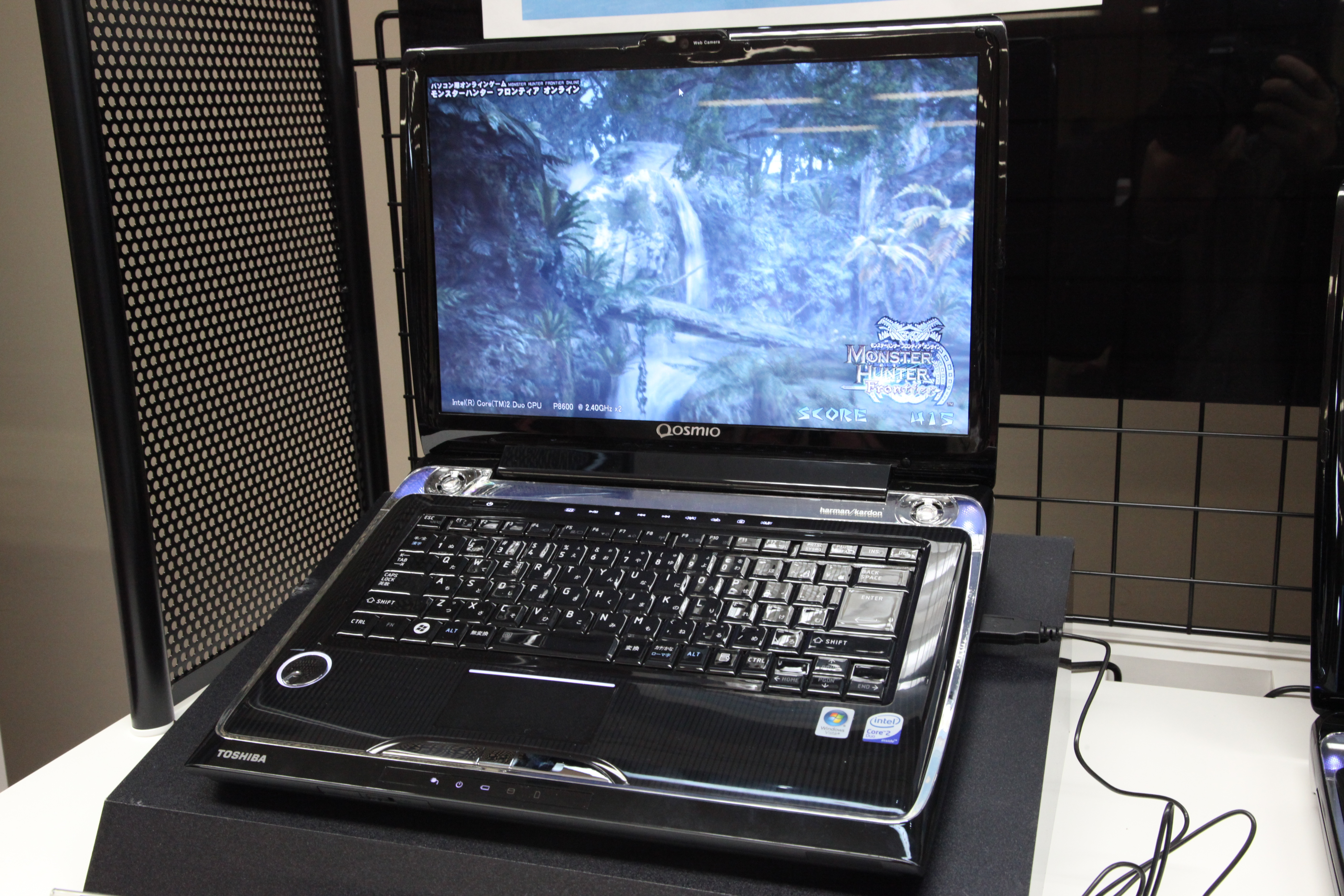
A Toshiba Dynabook Qosmio (Qosmio F50/F55) with Intel Core 2 Duo processor

=== F45 series ===
Released on February 7, 2007, the Toshiba F45 series was an upgraded line of F40 laptops with advertised features including Dolby Home Theater and a built-in subwoofer. The basic specs included an Intel Core 2 Duo T5450 Processor at 1.66 GHz, with 2 MB of L2 cache attached to a 64-bit 667 MHz FSB. It had 2 GB of PC2-5300 DDR2 SDRAM. The built-in DVD drive supported "+/- R double layer" technology. The integrated graphics processor was the Mobile Intel GMA X3100 with 8-256 MB of video memory shared with the system memory, the screen was a 15.4-inch "TruBrite" display with a 1280x800 native resolution (WXGA), and hard drives were about 200 GB in size (varied by model). 32-bit editions of Windows Vista Home Premium or Ultimate were normally shipped with the systems.

- Toshiba F45 models include: AV410, AV411, AV411B, AV412, AV413, AV423 and AV425

=== X300 series ===
Released on January 4, 2009, the Qosmio X300 models offered not only HD DVD reading capabilities but also writing capabilities in either 15 gigabyte or 30 gigabyte capacities. External audio/video controls were also added to allow for one touch recording. A remote control is available to allow control within 20 feet of the laptop. The X305 is red with flames around its back. The X300 replaces the Satellite X200.

- Toshiba Satellite X305 Models include: Q701, Q705, Q706, Q708, Q710, Q711, Q7113, Q712, Q715, Q720, Q7201, Q7203, Q725, Q7253, SP6828A, SP6828C, SP6828R. Models with both Core 2 Duo and Core 2 Quad processors were sold, along with the option of a GeForce 9700M GTS (individual cards; not SLI)

=== X500 series ===
Released on October 22, 2009, the X500 comes in many models, including: the X505-Q830, X505-Q832, X505-Q850, X505-Q870, X505-Q875, X505-Q880, and the X500-S1801. The X500 series introduced multi-touch capabilities to its touchpad. It supports Blu-ray playback, but only some models are able to write Blu-ray disks. The X500 had a much simpler black and red accented design than its predecessor, the X300.

- Other X500 models include: X500-PQX33A, X500-Q840S, X500-Q895S, X500-Q900S, X500-Q930X, X500-S1801, X500-S1811, X500-S1812, X500-S1812X

=== X770 series ===
The Qosmio X770 series was introduced on June 14, 2011, followed by the X775 series.

=== X870 series ===
Released in 2012 was the Qosmio X870 series, with the specifications including a new "Ivy Bridge" Intel Core i7 processor, a Nvidia GeForce GTX 670M graphics processor with 3 GB of video memory, a 17.3-inch 1920x1080 TN display, 16 GB of DDR3 memory clocked at 1600MHz, and a 2 TB hard disk drive.

=== X70/75 series ===
Released in 2013 was the Qosmio X70-A series, with a Nvidia GeForce GTX 770M graphics processor designed for gaming and multimedia usage.

Subsequently, released in late 2014 was the Qosmio X70-B series for the European market, with a significantly less powerful GPU, an AMD Radeon R9 M265X.

=== Specifications ===
Qosmio X series
Model	X300	X500
Chipset	Mobile Intel PM45 Express	Intel PM55 Express
CPU	Intel Core 2 Duo (P7350 at 2.0GHz with 3MB of L2 cache or Intel Core 2 Duo (P8600 at 2.4 GHz with 3 MB of L2 pcache Intel Core 2 Duo (P8700 at 2.53 GHz with 3 MB of L2 cache or T9550 at 2.66 GHz with 6 MB of L2 cache) or Intel Core 2 Extreme (X9100 at 3.06 GHz with 6 MB of L2 cache) Intel Core 2 Quad (Q9000 at 2.0 GHz with 6 MB of L2 cache) or Intel Core 2 Extreme (QX9300 at 2.53 GHz with 12 MB of L2 cache)	1.6 GHz Intel Core i7 "Clarksfield" 720QM, 1.73 GHz Intel Core i7 740QM, 2.00 GHz Intel Core i7 2630QM, or 2.53 GHz Intel Core i5 "Arrandale"
Memory	4GB DDR3 1066 (expandable to 8GB)	4GB DDR3 1066, 6GB DDR3 1066 (Q850) (expandable to 8GB), or 8GB DDR3 1333 (Q930X)
Graphics	2 Nvidia GeForce 9800M GTS cards with 512 MB of dedicated GDDR3 each in Scalable Link Interface or 1 Nvidia GeForce 9800M GTX with 1 GB of dedicated GDDR3 (X305-Q725)	1 Nvidia GeForce GTS 250 M with 1 GB of GDDR5 or 1 Nvidia GeForce GTS 360 M with 1 GB of GDDR5 or 1 Nvidia GeForce GTX 460M with 1.5 GB of GDDR5
Front Side Bus	1066 MHz	No FSB; uses 1xQPI 6.4 GT/s
Hard drive	320 GB 7200 RPM SATA, HD (Q830 and Q832); 64 GB SATA Solid State Drive and a 320 GB SATA 7200 RPM hard drive for a total of 384 GB (Q850)	320 to 500 GB 7200 RPM SATA HD with an optional second 64 GB SATA Solid State Drive in select models or 1TB (500 GB 7200 RPM+500 GB Hybrid drive 7200 RPM with 4GB SSD built-in).
Display	17" widescreen display at 1680×1050	18.4" display at 1680×945 (HD+)or 1920×1080 (Full HD)
Webcam	1.3 megapixels	1.3 megapixels
Connectivity	802.11 b/g/n Wireless LAN, Bluetooth 2.1, 1 Gigabit Ethernet port, 1 IEEE 1394 (FireWire) port, 1 Headphones audio out port, 1 Microphone audio in port, 1 e-SATA	802.11 b/g/n Wireless LAN, Bluetooth 2.1, 4 USB 2.0 ports, 1 Gigabit Ethernet port, 1 IEEE 1394 (FireWire) port, 1 Headphones audio out port, 1 Microphone audio in port, 1 e-SATA, 1 SPDIF
Audio	Harman Kardon 4.1 surround sound with two tweeters, two bass reflex speakers, and a subwoofer	Harman Kardon stereo speakers
Dimensions	12" × 16.2" × 1.7"	11.6" × 17.4" × 1.63"
Weight	9 lb. (4.08 kg)	10.23 lb. (4.64 kg)
Operating system	Windows Vista Home Premium or Windows Vista Ultimate, with dual-boot 32-bit and 64-bit	Windows 7 Home Premium or Windows 7 Professional, 64-bit

Expandability

This section encompasses current models only:

- 2 DDR3 memory slots supporting up to 8GB
- 5-in-1 Media Adapter supporting Secure Digital Card, Memory Stick, Memory Stick Pro, MultiMediaCard, and xD-Picture Card
- ExpressCard/54
- 1 each of VGA and HDMI ports

== Issues ==
The Qosmio F10 and G10 series, both early models, were plagued with chipset issues. When a defective unit was under considerable load for an extended period of time, the video chipset on the board was known to fail, causing considerable interference on the display and/or complete motherboard failure.
