= Shinano Kenshi =

- Type: Co., Ltd.
- Industry: Electric motors, Assistive Technology
- Founded: 1918
- Headquarters: Ueda, Nagano, Japan
- Area served: Japan, U.S., Mexico, Germany, China, India, Taiwan
- Key people: Yukihiro Kaneko
- Products: Brushless DC electric motor, stepper motor, assistive technology
- Revenue: $500,000,000
- Website: https://aspina-group.com/

Shinano Kenshi Co., Ltd. (シナノケンシ株式会社, Shinano Kenshi Kabushiki-gaisha) was founded in 1918 as Shinano Spun Silk Spinning Co., Ltd. to manufacture spun silk yarn, which at that time was one of the most high-tech industries in the world. As the years passed, the company expanded to other industrial markets while maintaining its silk operations. In 1962 the company established an Electrical Department and, in 1971 the company introduced a fan motor for air conditioning machines. The company started the production of tape decks in 1972 and, in 1973, the company introduced a gear motor for copying machines and changed the company name to Shinano Kenshi Co., Ltd.

In 1985 Hanaoka Hosei Co., Ltd., a subsidiary of Shinano Kenshi, changed its name to Texel Corporation. It developed the Plextor brand in 1993.

In 2019, Shinano Kenshi launched the global corporate brand “ASPINA.” While the legal company name remained unchanged, ASPINA has since been used as the unified brand for international communications and global business.

== Products ==
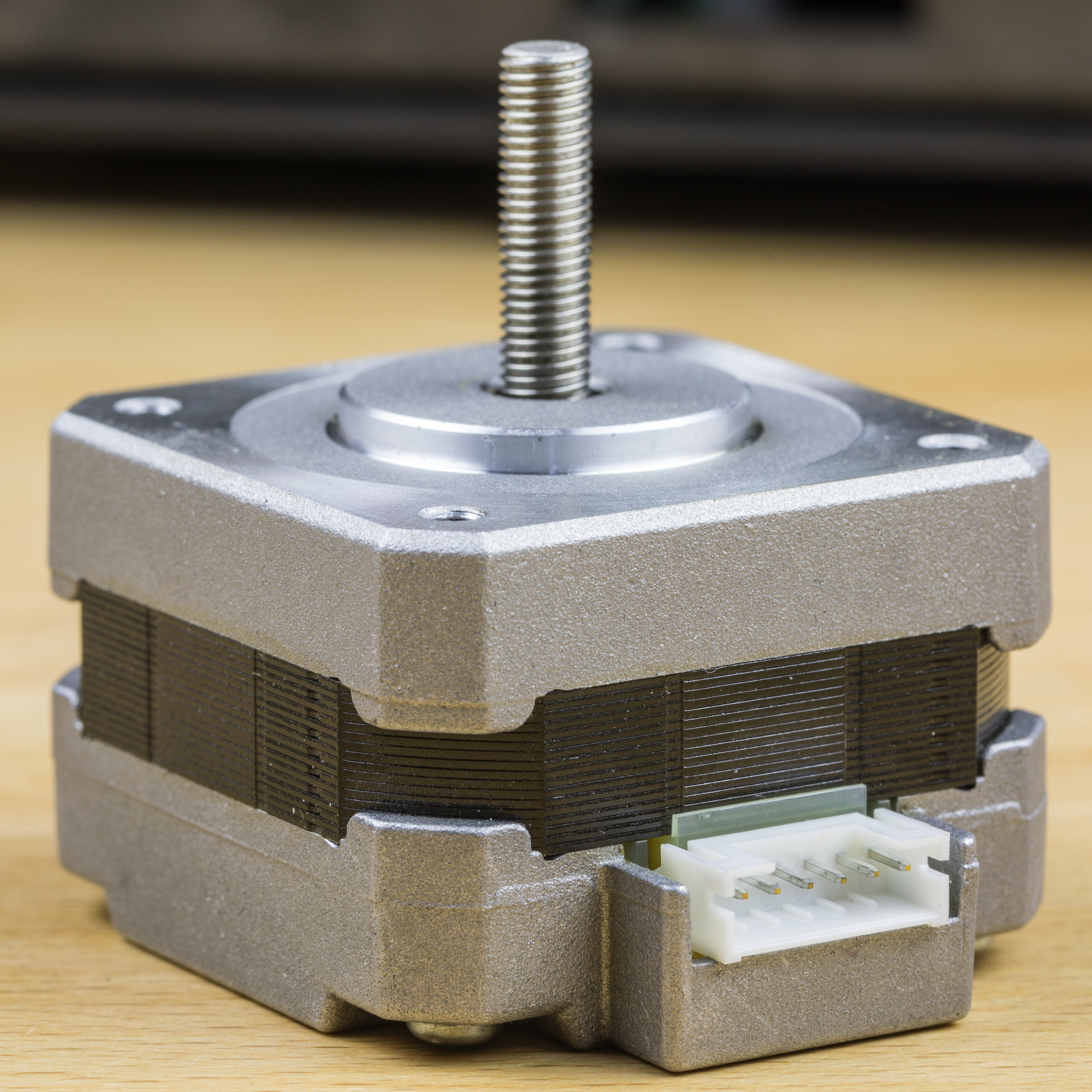
Stepper motor

- Precision Electric Motor
- Welfare & Life Assist equipment
