= MultiLevel Recording =

Proposed technology to increase the capacity of optical discs

MultiLevel Recording (ML, also known as M-ary) is a technology originally developed by Optex Corporation and promoted by Calimetrics to increase the storage capacity of optical discs. It failed to establish itself in the market. Through a combination of proprietary media, recorder, reader, and player modifications, Calimetrics proposed that ML could increase the capacity of a CD-ROM, CD-R, or CD-RW to 2 GB; a single-layer DVD, DVD-R, DVD+R, DVD-RW, DVD+RW, or DVD-RAM to 7.1 to 10 GB; and a single-layer Blu-ray Disc (BD) to as much as 60 GB. An optionally integrated digital rights management (DRM) system called MovieGuard was also suggested. An industry group called the ML Alliance was formed in 2000 to help commercialize ML technology. Members eventually included Calimetrics, TDK, Sanyo Semiconductor, Plextor, Matsushita Kotobuki Electronics, Mitsubishi Chemical Corporation, Verbatim, TEACr and Yamaha.

Several 2 GB ML CD-based recorders were developed for release in 2002 (TDK's MLCDRW1000 and Plextor's PX-ML3630), but never came to market. This was largely a business decision influenced by the rapid fall of CD-R/RW prices and the simultaneous rise in popularity of writable DVD technology. Calimetrics went on to work on more advanced DVD and Blu-ray Disc versions of their technology, including a proposal to build a next generation version of Enhanced Versatile Disc (EVD). Calimetrics ceased operations in 2004.

== Technology ==
To store information onto a physical surface, the data must be transformed into a series of marks using a modulation code. The codes used in most optical disc systems are binary, meaning that resulting surface has only two states: marks and non-marks. The following figure illustrates the EFM code used in CDs and DVDs:

Binary EFM code used in DVDs and CDs; example marks and corresponding signal

Because the edges are positioned on a grid that is finer than the minimum mark size, EFM achieves about 1.5 bits per minimum-mark, even though it is a binary code.

MultiLevel recording refers to the use of multiple reflectivity values to encode data onto an optical disc. By using more than two levels, more information can be put into the minimum feature size. The following figure illustrates a MultiLevel code (note: colors are used only to represent differences in intensity):

8-level ML code; example marks and corresponding signal

The 8-level code used on the prototype systems is a convolutional code, storing about 2.5 bits per data cell. By using this code in combination with a smaller mark size and a more efficient error-correction code, the capacity of CD media was tripled. When applied to dual-layer DVD, ML-recording can increase capacity by a factor of 1.9.

MultiLevel optical recording is an example of baseband pulse-amplitude modulation. While Non-binary, or M-ary, modulation is common in the telecom industry, the technique was originally developed and patented for optical disc recording at Optex Corporation in the early 1990s (in conjunction with the University of Rochester) for use with their Electron Trapping Optical Media (ETOM). Although simple in principle, implementation of ML was challenging, in large part because data storage channels are highly nonlinear. The overall ML-system response is much more sensitive to variations in its individual components (operating temperature, media uniformity, read-head fluctuation, etc.) than a conventional CD/DVD system. To compensate, the ML logical-format devotes a substantial portion of bits (as forward-error correction coding) to enhance robustness against media defects and signal noise. ML-drives used sophisticated power-optimization during writing and adaptive equalization during reading.

MultiLevel recording is sometimes confused with multi-layer storage, in which multiple data surfaces are combined into a single disc. Multi-layer and multiLevel technique can be combined (as in dual-layer ML-DVD ROM), where ML-modulation is applied to each individual layer of the disc.
