= Plextor =

Consumer electronics brand

- Industry: Computer hardware
- Founded: 1985; 41 years ago Chiyoda, Tokyo, Japan
- Headquarters: Taipei, Taiwan
- Products: SSDs, optical disc drives, networking tools
- Parent: Shinano Kenshi

Plextor (styled PLEXTOR) (Chinese: 浦科特; Japanese: プレクスター) is a Taiwanese (formerly Japanese) consumer electronics brand, best known for solid-state drives and optical disc drives.

== Company ==
The brand name Plextor was used for all products manufactured by the Electronic Equipment Division and Printing Equipment Division of the Japanese company Plextor Inc., which was a 100%-owned subsidiary company of Shinano Kenshi Corp., also a Japanese company. The brand was formerly known as TEXEL, under which name it introduced its first CD-ROM optical disc drive in 1989. The brand has been used for flash memory products, Blu-ray players and burners, DVD-ROM burners, CD-ROM burners, DVD and CD media, network hard disks, portable hard disks, digital video recorders, and floppy disk drives.

The brand Plextor was in 2010 licensed to Philips & Lite-On Digital Solutions Corporation, a subsidiary company of Lite-On Technology Corporation. Therefore, all the Plextor products since then, especially SSDs, are of a Taiwanese, not a Japanese brand. However, the Japanese company Plextor Inc., who originated this brand name, continues, and sells new products under other brands such as PLEXLOGGER and PLEXTALK.

On September 3, 2019, it was announced Lite-On would sell its SSD business to Toshiba Memory, which is now known as Kioxia. On January 10, 2024, Kioxia stopped using the brand name because of failure to adapt to the market as a result of neglecting to adapt PCIe Gen 4 and Gen 5 controllers. Plextor is now a brand from Ritek.

== Products ==
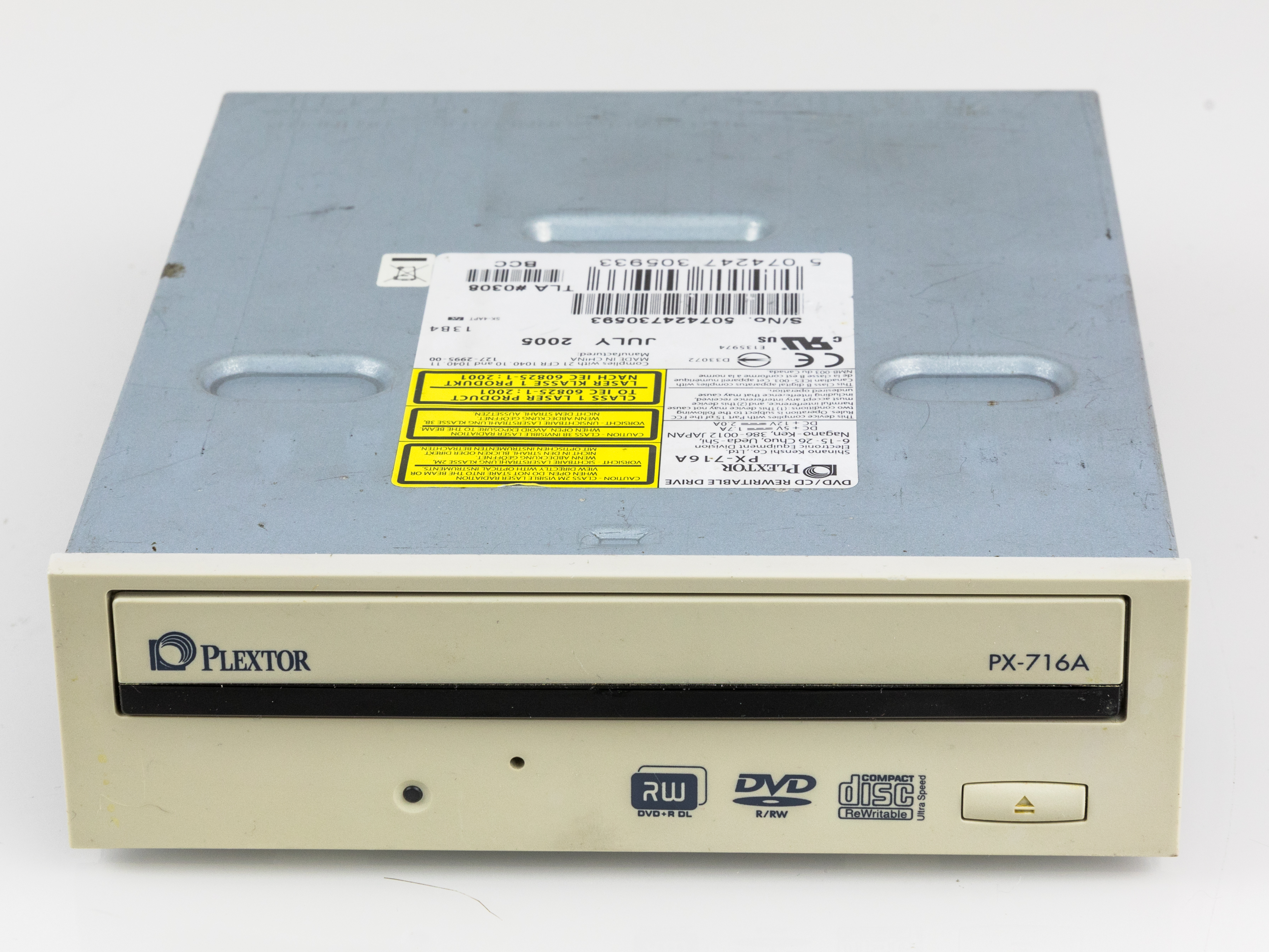
Plextor DVD/CD-RW disk drive, 2005

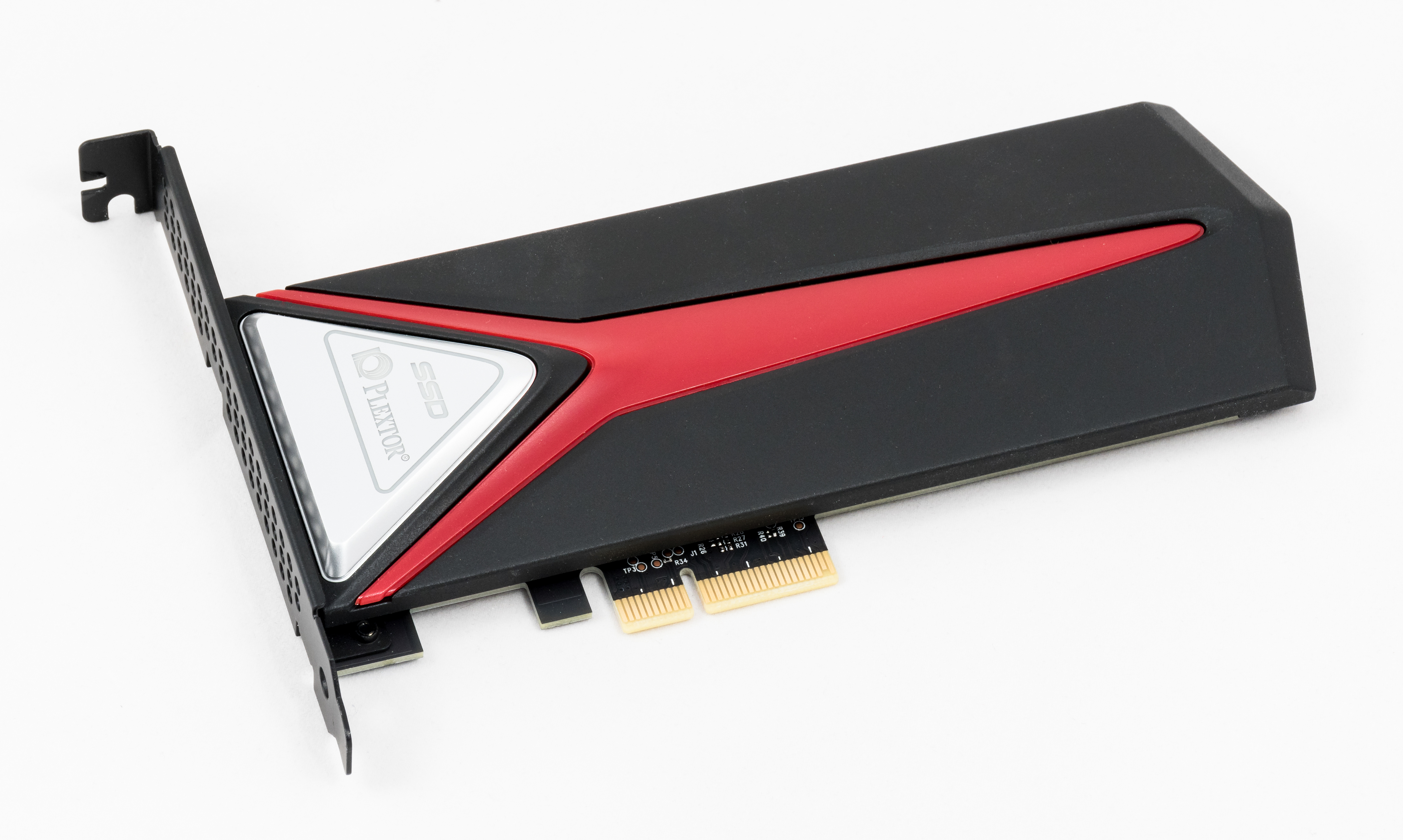
Plextor 256 GB SSD, PCIe x4

Plextor introduced its first solid state drives, the M1 SSD series available in 64 GB and 128 GB capacities. The M2 Series followed, which they claimed to be the first SATA 3 SSD available at the time. In October 2011, Plextor announced the M2P Series with increased performance.

In December 2011 and January 2012, Plextor released the M3 and M3 Pro Series in 64 to 512 GB capacities. Similar to its predecessor, the M3 is a SATA 6 Gbit/s interface with a Marvell chip set. New, is the 24 nm Toggle NAND Flash (instead of 32 nm Toggle NAND Flash used for the M1, M2, and M2P).

== Optical drives ==
Plextor optical drives are known for having an extended functionality and command set for power users, that has not been adapted by other optical drive vendors.

This functionality includes extended surface error scanning, GigaRec (higher density recording on CDs, similar to the DDCD "Purple Book" standard), VariRec (laser power calibration), and "Silent Mode", which has the ability to adjust the ejection and loading speed of the disc tray and to limit the rotation speed of the disc.

To make use of those features, Plextor provided a paid suite of tools called "PlexTools". In 2005, the parent company of Plextor, Shinano Kenshi, tried to thwart the creation of free and open-source alternatives to PlexTools by legally threatening third-party developers. Late model Plextor drives such as the PX-755, PX-760, and Premium 2 also protected the SCSI commands needed to use these features with a challenge-response mechanism based on Blowfish and MD5. These features are absent entirely in the latest Plextor drives that no longer use the Sanyo chipset.
