= Optical disc recording technologies =

List of technologies used to write to optical discs

Optical disc authoring requires a number of different optical disc recorder technologies working in tandem, from the optical disc media to the firmware to the control electronics of the optical disc drive.

== Types of recordable optical disc ==
There are numerous formats of recordable optical direct to disk on the market, all of which are based on using a laser to change the reflectivity of the digital recording medium in order to duplicate the effects of the pits and lands created when a commercial optical disc is pressed. Emerging technologies such as holographic data storage and 3D optical data storage aim to use entirely different data storage methods, but these products are in development and are not yet widely available.

The earliest form is magneto-optical, which uses a magnetic field in combination with a laser to write to the medium. Though not widely used in consumer equipment, the original NeXT cube used MO media as its standard storage device, and consumer MO technology is available in the form of Sony's MiniDisc. This form of medium is rewriteable.

The most common form of recordable optical media is write-once organic dye technology, popularized in the form of the CD-R and still used for higher-capacity media such as DVD-R. This uses the laser alone to scorch a transparent organic dye (usually cyanine, phthalocyanine, or azo compound-based) to create "pits" (i.e. dark spots) over a reflective spiral groove. Most such media are designated with an R (recordable) suffix. Such discs are often quite colorful, generally coming in shades of blue or pale yellow or green.

Rewritable, non-magnetic optical media are possible using phase change alloys, which are converted between crystalline and amorphous states (with different reflectivity) using the heat from the drive laser. Such media must be played in specially tuned drives, since the phase-change material has less of a contrast in reflectivity than dye-based media; while most modern drives support such media, many older CD drives cannot recognize the narrower threshold and cannot read such discs. Phase-change discs are designated with RW (ReWriteable) or RE (Recordable-Erasable). Phase-change discs often appear dark grey.

Another technology creates pits in an inorganic carbon layer, a "write-once" option. Created by Millenniata, M-DISC, records data on special M-DISC with a data life-time of several hundred years.

== Optimum Power Calibration ==
Optimum Power Calibration (OPC) is a function that checks the proper laser power for writing a particular session in the media in use. More sophisticated is Active OPC, which calculates the optimum laser power and adjusts it in real-time.

== Recording modes ==
Optical discs can be recorded in Disc At Once, Track At Once, Session at Once (i.e. multiple burning sessions for one disc), or packet writing modes. Each mode serves different purposes:

- Disc At Once: writes the entire disc in one pass; preferred for duplication masters
- Track At Once: writes individual tracks with a gap between tracks; used for audio CDs
- Session At Once: writes and finalizes multiple sessions on one CD; usually not supported for CD Audio, and not universally supported by authoring software
- Packet writing: writes data to the medium on demand (see below)

== Connection technologies ==
Unlike early CD-ROM drives, optical disc recorder drives have generally used industry standard connection protocols. Early computer-based CD recorders were generally connected by way of SCSI; however, as SCSI was abandoned by its most significant users (particularly Apple Computer), it became an expensive option for most computer users. As a result, the market switched over to Parallel ATA connections for most internal drives; external drives generally use PATA drive mechanisms connected to a bridge inside the case that connects to a high-speed serial bus such as FireWire or Hi-Speed USB 2.0. Nearly all modern drives, particularly Blu-ray drives use Serial ATA.

Standalone recorders use standard A/V connections, including RCA connectors, TOSlink, and S/PDIF for audio and RF, composite video, component video, S-Video, SCART, and FireWire for video. High-bandwidth digital connections such as HDMI are unlikely to feature as recorder devices are not permitted to decrypt the encrypted video content.

== Overburning ==
Overburning is the process of recording data past the normal, vendor-specified size limit of the recordable media. Structures in the ATIP do not allow such sizes to be specified.

Overburning may be used to determine the actual capacity limit of a recordable disc, since the capacity rated by recordable disc vendors merely is the guaranteed capacity, beyond which the actual capacity is indefinite. Data located beyond the specified capacity is not guaranteed to be readable.

== Buffer underrun protection ==
Usually, the recorder must perform a complete write without pauses. Once the laser is on, stopping and restarting the recording process may introduce flaws.

A buffer underrun occurs during recording if the supply of data to the recorder is interrupted before the write is complete. Software typically moves the data to be recorded into a buffer; underrun occurs if the recorder processes data in the buffer faster than the software reloads it. Historically, buffer underrun was often caused by writing data obtained from a slow device, or by slowness of the recording software, from a slow processor or a processor executing other tasks concurrently.

Various recorders minimize or cope with buffer underrun in the following ways:

- Nearly all burners can slow the rotation of the disc and record at a slower rate. A burner may do so on sensing that it is drawing down the data in the buffer faster than software is reloading it.
- Recording software maintains larger buffers than when CD recorders were first introduced. Some recorders maintain their own buffer memory independently of the computer. This additional buffering ensures that momentary pauses in the supply of data do not cause buffer underrun.
- Some recorders are, in fact, able to stop writing in the middle of a session, and resume writing whenever the buffer is refilled. Recorders with such buffer underrun protection handle the interruption with an extremely small gap in the recorded track on the disc. Since the techniques for protecting against buffer underrun are proprietary and vendor-specific, technical details vary.
- DVD+R, DVD+RW and the recordable Blu-ray formats are immune from buffer underrun as these discs contain technology that allows the recorder's write mechanism to precisely locate the end of the recorded track and to seamlessly carry on from where it left off. Many disc authoring utilities disable the buffer underrun protection option when these discs are being written.

Buffer underrun is minimized by a strategy in which the recorder burns a packet rather than an entire session or an entire disc. When using rewritable media (CD-RW, DVD-RW, DVD-RAM), the UDF file system organizes the disc into packets that are written individually. The packets are referenced by a single, updated address table.

A number of manufacturers have developed proprietary technologies to prevent buffer underruns, including Sanyo (BURN-Proof), Asus (FlextraLink), Sony (Power Burn) and Yamaha (SafeBurn).

== Packet writing ==
Packet writing is a technology that allows optical discs to be used in a similar manner to a floppy disk. Packet writing can be used both with once-writeable media and rewriteable media. Several competing and incompatible packet writing disk formats have been developed, including DirectCD and InCD. The standardized formats for packet writing are the Universal Disk Format in the plain, VAT, and spared builds.

== Simulated writing ==
Using the simulated writing or simulated burning feature of optical disc authoring software, the writing process will be simulated, which means that the disc spins and the laser moves as if on an actual writing process, but without any data being recorded to the disc.

This feature allows for observing the writing speeds and patterns (e.g. constant angular velocity, constant linear velocity and P-CAV and Z-CLV variants) with different writing speed settings and testing the highest capacity of an individual disc that would be achievable using overburning.

This feature is standardized on CD-R, CD-RW, DVD-R and DVD-RW, but not on DVD+R and DVD+RW, on which only Plextor optical drives support simulated writing so far.

== Longevity ==
Retail recordable/writable optical media contain dyes in/on the optical media to record data, whereas factory-manufactured optical media use physical "pits" created by plastic molds/casts. As a result, data storage on retail optical media does not have the life-span of factory-manufactured optical media. The problem is exacerbated because as the writing laser of the recorder is used, its power output drops with age - typically after just a few years. Consequently, a disc written with a laser that is nearing the end of its useful life may not have a readable life that is as long as if a new laser had been used.

Dye based optical media should not be solely relied on to archive valuable data. MAM-A (Mitsui) claims a life of 300 years on their archival gold CD-R and 100 years for gold DVDs. Good alternatives would be to additionally backup one's media using other media technologies and/or investing in non-volatile memory technologies.

A series of follow-up studies conducted by the Canadian Conservation Institute in 2019 revealed that CD-R with phthalocyanine-dye and a gold-metal layer had the greatest longevity at over 100 years when stored at ideal temperature and humidity-levels. The second longest was DVD-R (gold-metal layer) with an average longevity of 50-100 years under ideal conditions. CD-R with phthalocyanine and a silver-metal-alloy layer also scored an average longevity of 50-100 years, however, the researchers noted that if the storage environment contains pollutants any CD-Rs that used a silver layer would likely degrade faster than discs with a gold layer. The researchers concluded the silver layer discs may not be a suitable solution for applications where longevity is important. Both CD-R and DVD-R outperformed all forms of Blu-ray disc in regards to longevity: the best performing Blu-ray disc, the BD-RE (rewritable Blu-ray) has an average longevity of 20-50 years, while non-rewritable BD-R discs have an average longevity of 10-20 years under ideal conditions.

== See also ==
- CD and DVD writing speed
- MODS Disc
- Optical disc recording modes
- Write strategy
