= Blu-ray Disc recordable =

Blu-ray Disc media that can be written to using an optical disc recorder

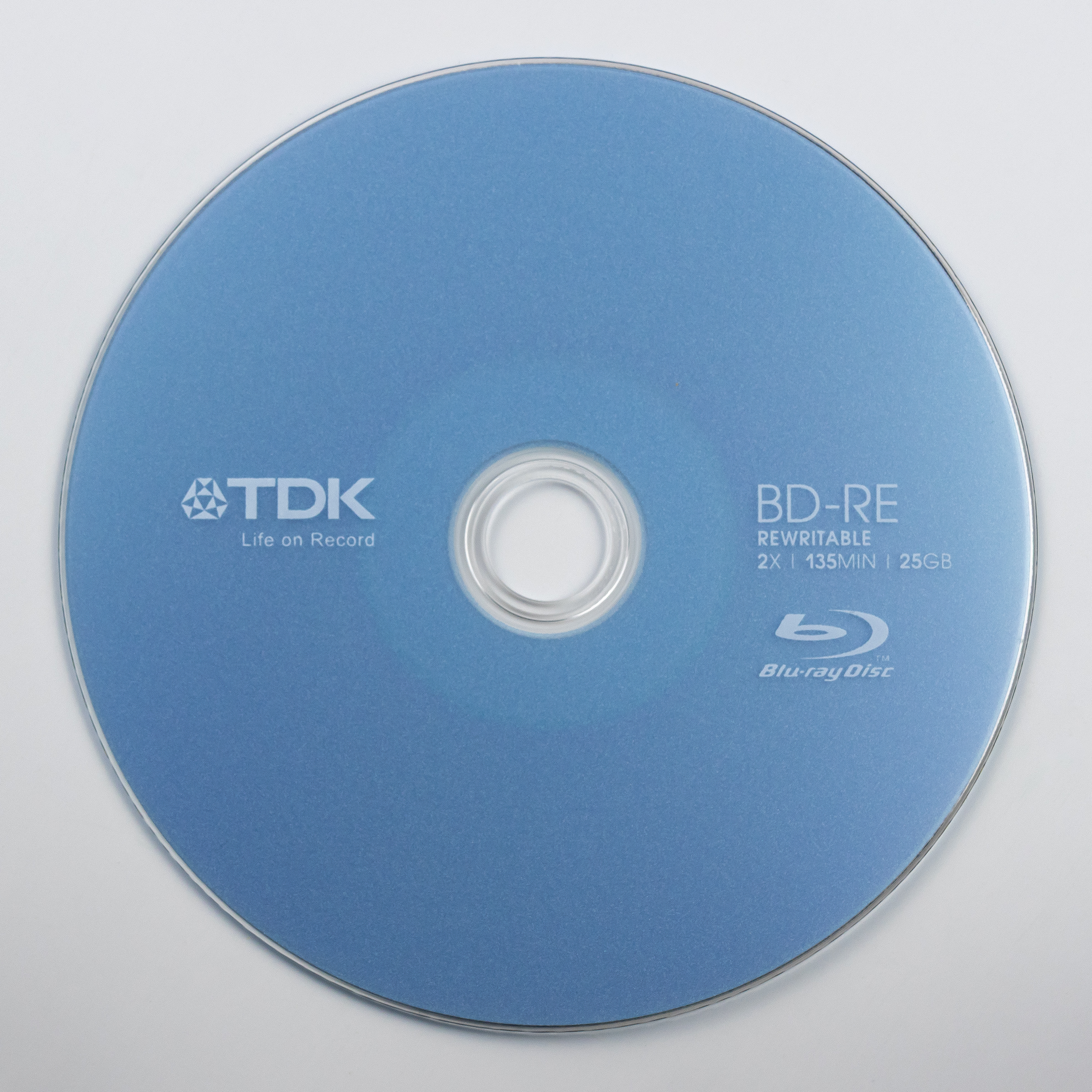
Label side of a blank rewritable TDK Blu-ray Disc (BD-RE)

Blu-ray Disc Recordable (BD-R) and Blu-ray Disc Recordable Erasable (BD-RE) refer to two direct to disc optical disc recording technologies that can be recorded on to a Blu-ray-based optical disc with an optical disc recorder. BD-R discs can only be written to once, whereas BD-RE discs can be erased and re-recorded multiple times, similar to CD-R and CD-RW for a compact disc (CD). Disc capacities are 25 GB for single-layer discs, 50 GB for double-layer discs, 100 GB ("BDXL") for triple-layer, and 128 GB ("BDXL") for quadruple-layer (in BD-R only).

The minimum speed at which a Blu-ray Disc can be written is 36 megabits (4.5 megabytes) per second.

As of 2024, one of the primary pioneers of the Blu-ray disc, Sony, is winding down production of recordable Blu-ray discs in its plant in Tagajō, Japan. Sony plans to gradually cease its manufacturing of optical media, including recordable Blu-ray discs.

== Version ==
As of November 2022, there are five versions of BD-RE and four versions of BD-R formats. Each version includes three Parts (a.k.a. Books): Basic Format Specifications, File System Specifications, Audio Visual Basic Specifications. Each part has sub-versions (e.g. R2 Format Specification includes Part 3: Audio Visual Basic Specifications Ver.3.02, Part 2: File System Specifications Ver. 1.11, Part 1: Basic Format Specifications Ver. 1.3).

In spite of having the "Blu-ray" brand, "BDXL" (or "BD-XL") is separate from the original "BD" format, meaning existing Blu-ray drives that predate the release of BDXL (mid-2010) do not support BDXL. Even Blu-ray drives released after that date may not necessarily support BDXL unless explicitly stated.

Date	RE Version	R Version	By Parts (Note: RE and R definitions from the same date have different Part 1 and Part 2 specifications, but share the same Part 3 specifications.)			Changes
Date	RE Version	R Version	Part 1	Part 2	Part 3	Changes
2002	1.0		RE V1.0	RE V1.0	RE V1.0	BD File System (BDFS), computer-incompatible; BD Audio/Visual (BDAV) format; BD content protection (BDCP)
2005	2.0	1.0	RE V2.1; R V1.3	RE V2.1; R V1.1	RE V2.1	New UDF 2.5 file system for computer use; UDF 2.6 also available for BD-R; Uses AACS; Hybrid formats (inapplicable to recordable discs); New BD-R Low To High physical format.
September 2006	3.0	2.0	RE V2.1; R V1.3	RE V2.1; R V1.1	RE V3.0 + ROM V2.4 (BDMV)	New camcorder sized (8 cm) discs; "Camcorder" added to product categories; BDMV (Blu-ray Disc Movie) application format
June 2010	4.0	3.0	RE V3.0; R V2.0	RE V3.0; R V2.0	RE V4.0 + RE V2.1	New BDXL definition: Multi-layered BDAV rewritable/recordable disc with 2× and 4× speeds; 100 GB capacity; "Professional Device" added to BD product categories
December 2017	5.0	4.0	RE V3.1; R V2.2	RE V4.0; R V3.0	RE V5.0	BDXL expansions: New 128 GB BD-R capacity; Ultra HD broadcast recording support

== Capacity ==
Blu-ray disc capacities
Type	Data layers	Capacity One logical sector stores 2048 bytes.	First released in year
BD-R, BD-RE (single-layer)	1	25 GB (25,025,314,816 bytes) 12,219,392 sectors	2006
BD-R DL, BD-RE DL (dual-layer)	2	50 GB (50,050,629,632 bytes) 24,438,784 sectors	2006
BD-R XL, BD-RE XL (triple-layer) Also known as "BD-R TL" and "BD-RE TL".	3	100 GB (100,103,356,416 bytes) 48,878,592 sectors	2010
BD-R XL (quadruple-layer) Also known as "BD-R QL".	4	128 GB (128,001,769,472 bytes) 62,500,864 sectors	2018
The sector counts in this table are logical sectors, not physical sectors. "Logical" means it is the sector size exposed to the operating system. To try to maintain reading compatibility with operating systems and software that predate the Blu-ray disc, the logical sector size matches the 2048 bytes of the CD-ROM (not Audio CD, which has 2352-byte sectors).

A single-layer Blu-ray disc (BD-R and BD-RE) has a capacity of 25,025,314,816 bytes, which are 23,866 MiB. A dual-layer Blu-ray disc (BD-R DL and BD-RE DL) has 50,050,629,632 bytes, which are 47,732 MiB. This is exactly twice the capacity, unlike dual-layer DVDs, which only have less than twice the capacity as single-layer DVDs.

BDXL discs store more per data layer, roughly 30 GiB, so they are able to store 100 GB in only three instead of four layers. No single-layer variant for BDXL exists, given that a first-generation BD-R DL disc already exceeds the capacity of one layer of a BDXL. There are variants with 100 GB and 128 GB, the latter of which has slightly less capacity per data layer but one additional data layer. A 100 GB BDXL has three data layers and 100,103,356,416 bytes (95,466 MiB) of capacity, which is 2 MiB less than twice the capacity of a BD-R(E) DL, and a 128 GB BDXL has four data layers and 128,001,769,472 bytes (122,072 MiB) of capacity and only exists as write-once variant (BD-R XL).

This area is referred to as the "Volume Space" in the UDF specification, and stores the file system, names of files and folders, and the file contents. The same area is referred to as the "program area" on the CD. Other information such as where the disc sessions and tracks are located and their length are stored outside this area.

If the spare area is enabled, 256 MiB (268.435.456 bytes) are taken away from the "Volume Space" and reserved for the spare area. Within the "Volume Space", the capacity that can be occupied by the content of files is also slightly reduced by file system overhead and by slack space as well, but the amount of slack space is trivial given that file systems on optical discs use a low cluster size (also referred to as "logical sector size") of 2 KiB (2048 bytes), matching the size of a single physical sector on optical discs. With packet writing, the file system overhead is larger.

The spare area is where the drive stores addresses for unreadable sectors so they are replaced with new data in case. This is known as defect management and is handled internally by the drive, not by the computer's operating system. On some earlier formats, including the CD-RW and DVD±RW, defect management has to be handled by the UDF file system, meaning by the computer, also referred to as the "host" system.

== Speed ==
As of December 2018, the following speeds are seen in Blu-Ray specifications for R/RE discs:

Drive speed	Data rate			25 GB BD-R(E) write time	50 GB BD-R(E) DL (25 GB/layer) write time	100 GB BD-R(E) XL TL (~33 GB/layer) write time
1×	36 Mbit/s	4.5 MB/s	4.29 MiB/s	~95 min.	~190 min.	~380 min.
2×	72 Mbit/s	9 MB/s	8.58 MiB/s	~47 min.	~94 min.	~188 min.
4×	144 Mbit/s	18 MB/s	17.17 MiB/s	~24 min.	~48 min.	~96 min.
6×	216 Mbit/s	27 MB/s	25.75 MiB/s	~16 min.	~32 min.	~64 min.
8×	288 Mbit/s	36 MB/s	~34.32 MiB/s	~11.25 min.	~22.5 min.	~45 min.
10×	360 Mbit/s	45 MB/s	42.898 MiB/s	~9 min.	~18 min.	~36 min.
12×	432 Mbit/s	54 MB/s	~51.48 MiB/s	~7.5 min.	~15 min.	~30 min.
14×	504 Mbit/s	63 MB/s	~60 MiB/s	~6.5 min.	~13 min.	~26 min.
16×	576 Mbit/s	72 MB/s	~68.64 MiB/s	~5.7 min.	~11.5 min.	~23 min.

2× speeds are mandatory for all formats, with 4× and 6× being optional for non-XL BD-R media. Since BD-RE 5.0/BD-R 4.0, a read speed of 4× is mandatory for UHD support.

Note: If write verification is enabled, as it may be by default on some burning software, the write will take longer to complete. Erasing a BD-RE is not necessary since existing data can be directly overwritten. Unlike with CD-RW, there is no need for blanking BD-RE before re-use, but they need to be formatted before first use. Burn programs may detect the unformatted state and automatically format the medium before beginning to write.

Write verification is a feature of formatted Blu-ray media, officially called "Defect Management". Similar functionality existed on DVD-RAM and on Mount Rainer-supporting disc drives, but BD-R is the first write-once media with such functionality. If not deactivated, the correctness of the written data is verified immediately after being written. Poorly readable data can be written again to an area of spare blocks, but the writing speed is halved during the entire writing process because only half of the disc rotations are for writing. Defect management can be deactivated by burn programs using a feature called "Stream Recording" which enables full nominal write speed. Whether defect management is beneficial with mediocre media depends much on the individual medium and the drive's firmware. It works well with narrowly located bad spots but tends to fail more often than stream recording if the drive perceives reduced read quality on the whole medium. It may be desirable to deactivate write verification on undamaged media to save time when mass-producing physical copies of data, since errors are unlikely to occur on physically undamaged media.

== Pricing ==
As of April 2018 (approximate pricing):

- BD-R/RE drive US$50 and above
- 6× single-layer BD-R disc (25 GB) US$0.42 each in quantity;
- 10× single-layer BD-R disc (25 GB) CN¥2.04 each in quantity;
- 6× double-layer BD-R disc (50 GB) US$1.64 in quantity;
- 2× single-layer BD-RE disc (25 GB) US$0.82 in quantity;
- 2× double-layer BD-RE disc (50 GB) US$3.15 in quantity;
- 4× BD-R XL disc (100 GB) US$5 in quantity;
- 4× BD-RE XL disc (100 GB) US$11 in quantity;

== Recording mechanisms ==
Instead of the pits and lands found on prepressed/prerecorded/replicated discs, BD-R and RE discs contain grooves which contain a wobble frequency that is used to locate the position of the reading or writing laser on the disc. BD-R has an Optimum Power Calibrations (OPC) / Test Zone, which is used to calibrate (finely adjust) the power of the writing laser before and during writing, and it also has a Drive Calibration Zone (DCZ) at the outer edge of the disc, for optional high speed calibration. The calibration is necessary to allow for slight manufacturing defects, greatly reducing or completely eliminating rejected discs and drives, reducing costs and eliminating potential waste. The information below describes the different types of recording layers that may be used on BD-R and BD-RE discs.

=== HTL (high to low) ===
"Normal" BD-R discs use a composite (or, in the case of BD-RE, a phase-changing alloy) that decreases its reflectivity on recording, i.e. "High To Low". Sony, for example, uses an inorganic composite that splits into two laminar components with low reflectivity. Composites used may include BiN, Ge_{3}N_{4}, and Pd-doped tellurium suboxide. A pair of layers with copper alloy and silicon that combines on recording may alternatively be used. Similar to CD-RW and DVD-RW, a phase transition alloy (often GeSbTe or InAgTeSb; copper silicate (CuSi) or other alloys can also be used, like Verbatim's proprietary MABL) is used for BD-RE discs. Melting the material with a very high power beam turns it into an amorphous state with low reflectivity, while heating at a lower power erases it back to a crystalline state with high reflectivity.

In BD-RE discs, the data layers are surrounded by a pair of dielectric Zinc Sulfur-Silicon Dioxide layers. An adhesive spacer layer and a semi-reflective layer are used for multi-layer discs. The recording and dielectric layers are all deposited using sputtering. On multi-layer BD-RE discs, each GeSbTe recording layer is progressively thinner. So the first layer (L0) is 10 nm thick, L1 is 7.5 nm thick, L2 is 6 nm thick, and so on. The silver alloy reflective layers that are behind each recording layer also become progressively thinner, so the L0 silver layer is 10 nm thick, the L1 layer is 9 nm thick, the L2 layer is 7 nm thick, and so on. The separation layers that separate the recording layers from one another also progressively become thinner.

=== BD-R LTH (low to high) ===
BD-R LTH is a write-once Blu-ray Disc format that features an organic dye recording layer. "Low To High" refers to the reflectivity changing from low to high during the burning process, which is the opposite of normal Blu-rays, whose reflectivity changes from high to low during writing. The advantage of BD-R LTH is it can protect a manufacturer's investment in DVD-R/CD-R manufacturing equipment because it does not require investing in new production lines and manufacturing equipment. Instead, the manufacturer only needs to modify current equipment. This is expected to lower the cost of disc manufacturing.

Old Blu-ray players and recorders cannot utilize BD-R LTH; however, a firmware upgrade can enable devices to access BD-R LTH. Panasonic released such a firmware update in November 2007 for its DMR-BW200, DMR-BR100 and MR-BW900/BW800/BW700 models. Pioneer was expected to ship the first LTH BD drives in Spring 2008. Sony upgraded the PlayStation 3 firmware enabling BD-R LTH reading in March, 2008.

In 2011, France's Ministry of Culture and Communication conducted a study on the suitability of data archival of LTH (low to high) discs compared to HTL (high to low) discs. The data they collected indicated that the overall quality of LTH discs is worse than HTL discs.

== Recording modes ==
A BD-R has three recording modes: SRM (sequential recording mode), SRM+POW (sequential recording mode + pseudo-overwrite), and RRM (random recording mode). On each BD-R, this mode can only be set once, and is set before writing any data. SRM is also known as SRM-POW (SRM without POW). It is the fastest mode and does not reserve a 256 MiB overhead. SRM+POW can simulate overwriting on write-once media by mapping physical data blocks to different logical blocks, meaning blocks exposed to the operating system, a feature used by UDF version 2.60. Unlike with packet writing (used from UDF 1.50 to 2.50), this is done by the drive rather than the operating system. The operating system only needs to specify where it wants the new data to appear, and the drive handles the rest. A BD-RE is randomly writable.

== See also ==
- Blu-ray
- CD-R, DVD±R
- DVD recordable
- List of optical disc manufacturers
- Optical disc authoring
