= MODISC =

MODISC may refer to:

- Magneto-optical disc, a computer storage medium introduced in 1985
- M-DISC, an archival type of recordable DVD or Blu-ray disc media
