= Live File System =

Windows file system for CD and DVD

Live File System is the term Microsoft uses to describe the packet writing method of creating discs in Windows Vista and later, which allows writeable optical media to act like mass storage by replicating its file operations. Live File System lets users manage files on recordable and rewriteable optical discs inside the file manager with the familiar workflow known from mass storage media such as USB flash drives and external hard disk drives.

Files can be added incrementally to the media, as well as modified, moved and deleted. These discs use the UDF file system. The supported UDF versions for usage as a live file system are UDF 1.50, UDF 2.00, UDF 2.01, UDF 2.50 for CD-R, CD-RW, DVD±R, DVD±RW and BD-RE, and UDF 2.60 for BD-R. (Note: Although HD-DVD has also been supported, the disc type has been discontinued.) However even if UDF 1.50 and above can be read, only the plain UDF build may be supported and not necessarily either the VAT or Spared UDF builds required for full compatibility. Windows 2000 for example only supports the original UDF 1.50 variation and not the Virtual Allocation Table build for remapped physical blocks; something not all optical drive units fully implement either.

The Live File System option is used by default by AutoPlay when formatting/erasing a CD/DVD -R or -RW.

== Compatibility ==
Older Windows versions do not have support for reading the latest UDF versions. If users create DVD/CDs in Windows Vista using UDF 2.50, these may not be readable on other systems, including Windows XP and older (pre-Mac OS 10.5) Apple systems unless a third-party UDF reader driver is installed. To ensure compatibility of disks created on Windows Vista, UDF 2.01 or lower should be selected.

== See also ==
- InCD – Commonly used for packet writing before natively supported since Windows Vista
