= M-DISC =

Write-once optical disc technology

- Media type: Write-once optical disc
- Encoding: Universal Disk Format (UDF)
- Standard: DVD, Blu-ray, Blu-ray BDXL
- Developed by: Millenniata, Inc.
- Manufactured by: Millenniata, Verbatim, Ritek
- Dimensions: Diameter: 120 mm (4.7 in)
- Usage: Archival storage
- Extended from: DVD+R, BD-R, BD-R DL, BDXL-R TL
- Released: 2009

M-DISC (Millennial Disc) is a write-once optical disc technology introduced in 2009 by Millenniata, Inc. and available as DVD and Blu-ray discs.

== Overview ==
M-DISC's design is intended to provide archival media longevity. M-Disc claims that properly stored M-DISC DVD recordings will last up to 1000 years. The M-DISC DVD looks like a standard disc, except it is almost transparent with later DVD and BD-R M-Disks having standard and inkjet printable labels.

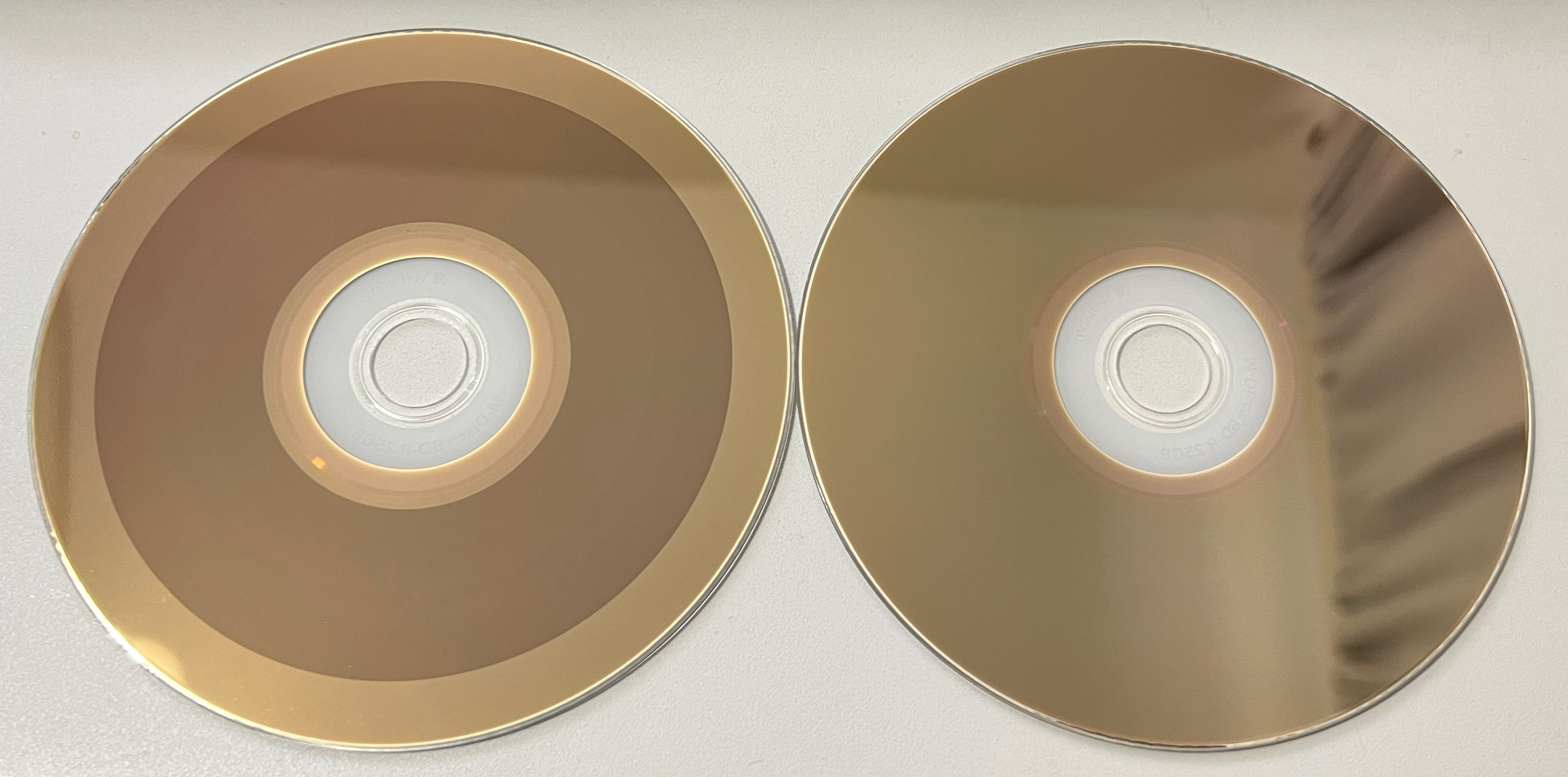
On the left is an 25GB BD-R M-disc written with information, on the right is an unwritten, blank 25GB BD-R M-disc. These discs have been discontinued, and the M-Disc currently available has a darker tint as shown in the below image.

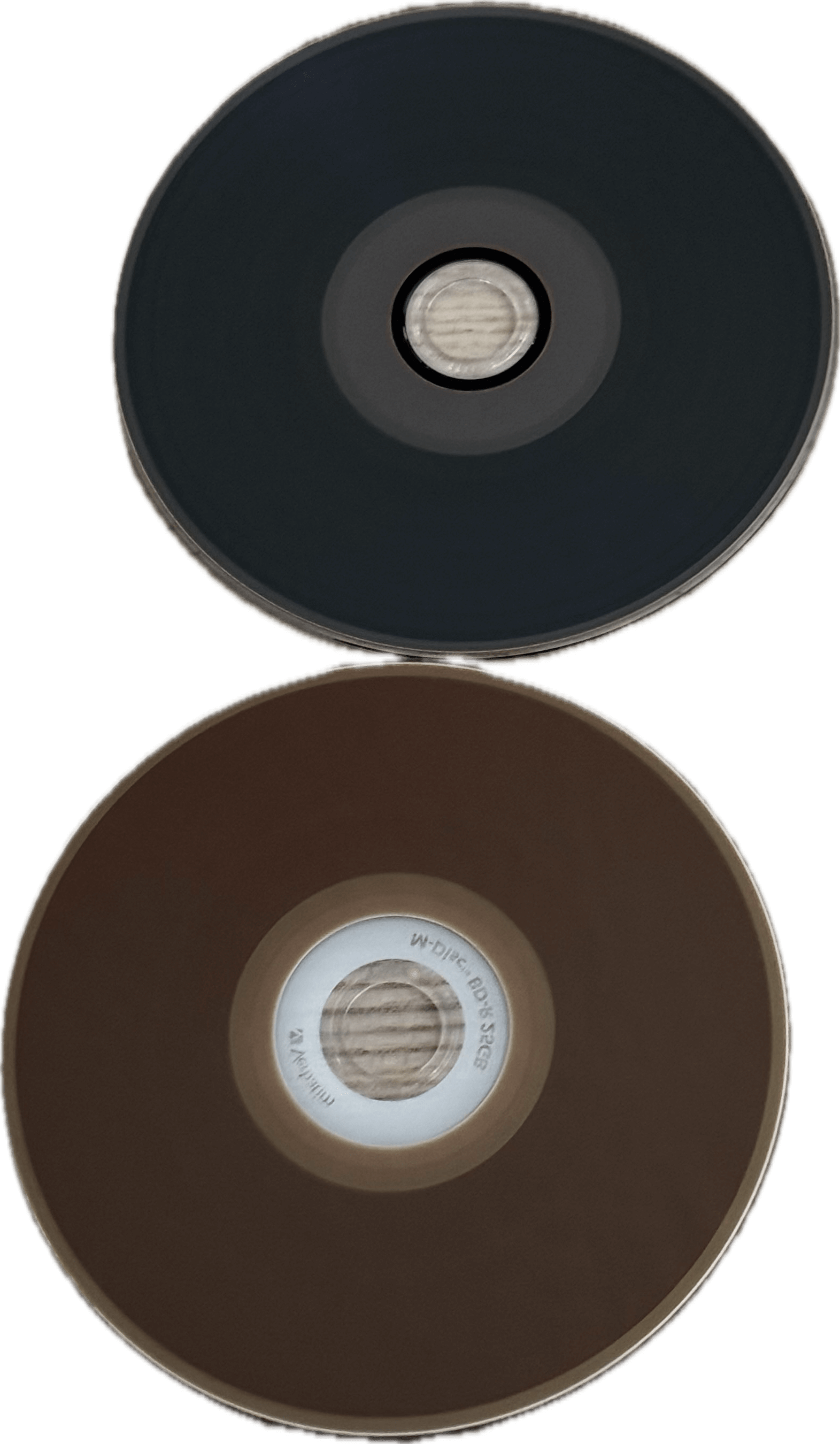
On the top is a 25GB Verbatim BD-R M-DISC currently sold on the market (media ID: VERBAT-IMe, MABL-based), and on the bottom is a discontinued 25GB Verbatim BD-R M-DISC (media ID: MILLEN-MR1) available prior to 2022. Both discs have been written with information.

The patents protecting the M-DISC technology assert that the data layer is a glassy carbon material that is substantially inert to oxidation and has a melting point of 200–1000 °C (392–1832 °F).

M-Discs are readable by most regular DVD players made after 2005 and Blu-Ray and BDXL disc drives and writable by most made after 2011.

Available recording capacities conform to standard DVD/Blu-ray sizes: 4.7 GB DVD+R to 25 GB BD-R, 50 GB BD-R and 100 GB BDXL.

== History ==
M-DISC developer Millenniata, Inc. was co-founded by Brigham Young University professors Barry Lunt, Matthew Linford, CEO Henry O'Connell and CTO Doug Hansen. The company was incorporated on May 13, 2010, in American Fork, Utah.

Millenniata, Inc. officially went bankrupt in December 2016. Under the direction of CEO Paul Brockbank, Millenniata had issued convertible debt. When the obligation for conversion was not satisfied, the company defaulted on the debt payment and the debt holders took possession of all of the company's assets. The debt holders subsequently started a new company, Yours.co, to sell M-DISCs and related services.

As of the 2020s, there are only 2 licensed manufacturers of M-Discs: Ritek, sold under the Ritek and RiDATA brands, and Verbatim with co-branded discs, marketed as the "Verbatim M-DISC".

128 GB BDXL never made it to market due to the 2016 bankruptcy.

Early in 2022, Verbatim changed the formulation of their M-DISC branded Blu-rays. These new discs could be written at a faster rate than the previous ones – 6× speed instead of 4×. The new discs also had different colouration and markings compared with older version. Later in the year customers accused Verbatim of selling an inferior product and deceptive marketing. Verbatim responded that the new discs were a further development of the older discs and should have the same longevity, and that the technical changes therein were responsible for the altered appearance and higher write speeds. The updated M-DISC currently sold on the market uses the same metal ablative layer (MABL) metal oxide inorganic recording layer used in many of Verbatim's regular Blu-ray products.

== Durability claims ==
The original M-DISC DVD+R was tested according to ISO/IEC 10995:2011 and ECMA-379 with a projected rated lifespan of several hundred years in archival use.

The glassy carbon layers, in theory if preserved correctly in an environment like a salt mine, could store the data for over 10,000 years before going outside of readable specifications. However, the polycarbonate plastics, which are commonly used by almost all optical media and heavily in CBRN and ballistic protective equipment due to their optical, physical impact and chemical resistant properties, have a lifespan rating of only around 1000 years before degradation.

Verbatim Japan claims that M-DISCs now use a titanium layer to prevent moisture ingression and to provide environmental stability. M-DISCs sold in Japan are advertised to have a projected lifespan of 100 years or more based on internal ISO/IEC 16963 testing, while other regional Verbatim websites claim that M-DISCs have a projected lifespan of "several hundred years" based on ISO/IEC 16963 testing.

== Durability testing ==
In 2009, testing was done by the US Department of Defense (DoD) producing the China Lake Report testing Millenniata's M-Disk DVD to current market offerings from Delkin, MAM-A, Mitsubishi, Taiyo Yuden and Verbatim with all brands using organic dyes failing to pass the series of accelerated aging tests.

From 2010 to 2012, the French National Laboratory of Metrology and Testing (LNE) used high-temperature accelerated aging testing, at 90 °C (194 °F) and 85% relative humidity inside a CLIMATS Excal 5423-U, for 250 to 1000 hours with a mix of inorganic DVD+R discs from MPO, Verbatim, Maxell, Syylex and DataTresor. The summary of the tests states that Syylex Glass Master Disc was rated for 1000+ hours, DataTresor Disc 250 hours+ and M-Disk under 250 hours. The Syylex disc was a custom-ordered product that could not be burned in a consumer player when they were still purchaseable from Syylex before their bankruptcy, so it was not truly in the same category as the others.

In 2016, a consumer Mol Smith did real world stress testing on the 25 GB BD-R M-Disc alongside TDK's standard BD-R 25 GB disc using a copied movie, which demonstrated the reliability of M-Disc's molding compared to standard discs; after 60 days of outdoor direct exposure the M-Disk was played without error, while the TDK disc was physically destroyed.

In 2022, the NIST Interagency Report NIST IR 8387 listed the M-Disc as an acceptable archival format rated for 100+ years, citing the aforementioned 2009 and 2012 tests by the US Department of Defense and French National Laboratory of Metrology and Testing as sources.

== Commercial support ==
While recorded discs are readable in conventional DVD and BD drives, M-disc DVDs can only be burned by drives with firmware that supports the slightly higher power mode that M-Disk requires for burning its inorganic layers, as such writing speed is typically 2× speed.

Blu-ray M-discs can be both written and read in most standard Blu-ray drives and are certified by the Blu-ray Disc Association to meet all current standard specifications as of 2019.

Typically, the M-Discs cost 1.5–3× the price of standard Blu-Ray discs with DVD M-Discs now having sparse availability.

With the first-generation DVD M-DISCs, it was difficult to determine which was the writable side of the disc due to being near fully translucent, until coloring and later labels similar to that on standard DVD discs was added to discs to help distinguish the sides preventing user error.

Asus, LG Electronics, Lite-On, Pioneer, Buffalo Technology, and Hitachi-LG produce drives that can record M-DISC media while Verbatim and Ritek produce M-DISC discs.

== Adoption ==
The regional government of the U.S. state of Utah has used M-Disc since 2011.

Some consumers and avid datahoarders have adopted the format for cold digital data storage.

== Alternative technologies ==
=== Optical ===
Syylex Glass Master Disc: these discs use etched glass and are only typically degradable by physical or chemical damage, but not by normal ageing inside an archival environment.

Current BD 25 GB, BD-R DL 50 GB & BDXL 100 GB (three layer) and Sony's BDXL 128 GB (four layer) discs are rated for up to 50 years (Standard inorganic HTL discs).

Sony's Optical Disc Archive, is an optical competitor to the LTO tape-based data storage system, currently with up to 5.5 TB cartridges of dual-sided 120mm discs, with desktop readers and automated rackmount standard archival systems allowing for large scale archival and data retrieval rated for an estimated 100+ years.

Pioneer DM for Archive is a disc media and drive combination developed by Pioneer to meet the requirements laid out by the Japanese government for preservation of financial data for a minimum of 100 years. The discs use a MABL type recording layer and are manufactured with tight tolerances. Although burnable in any BD Writer, when burned in Pioneers DM for Archive writers using the DM Archiver software the media and burn quality meet ISO/IEC 18630 which defines the testing methods needed for ensuring media and burn quality.

=== Magnetic ===
Linear Tape-Open (LTO) is rated for up to 30 years in a climate-controlled environment and is currently in use by most industries, including broadcast and corporate digital data systems. The latest generation released in 2026 is LTO-10, it defines two unique cartridge types which can hold 30 TB or 40 TB each

Hard disk drives are currently available up to 30 TB (HDD) capacity in 3.5-inch format and 5 TB in 2.5-inch laptop format. However, unlike optical media, they are limited to 5–25 years of operation lifespan due to inevitable mechanical failure or magnetic instability.

== Gallery ==
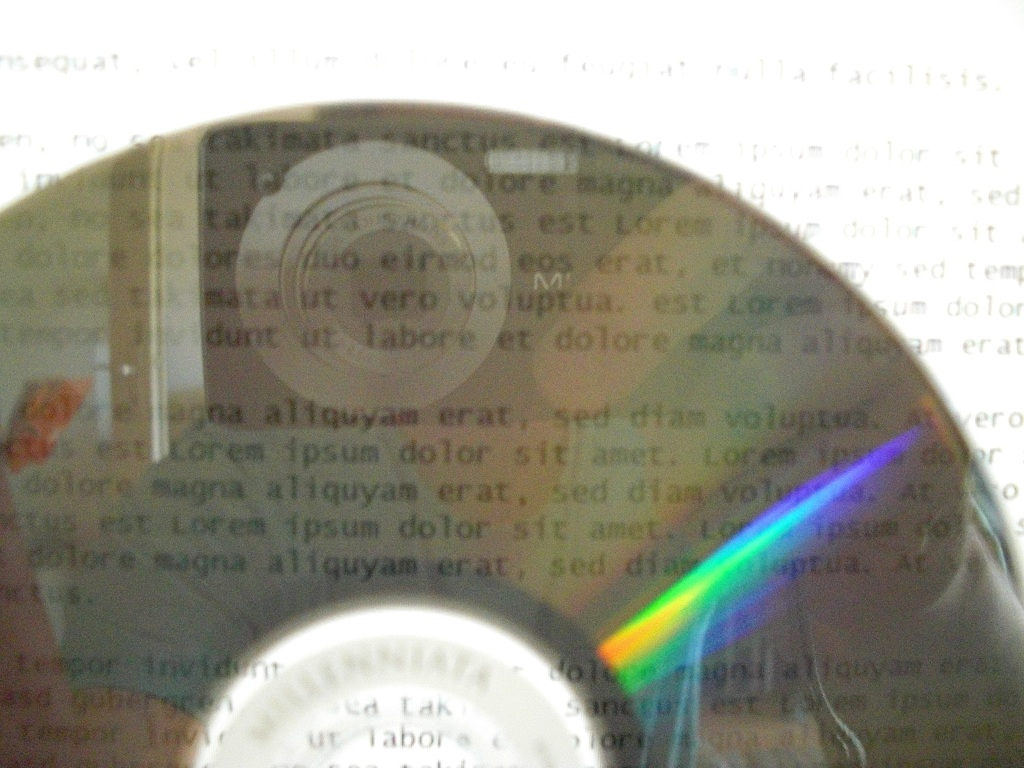
M-DISC optical storage medium transparency demonstration

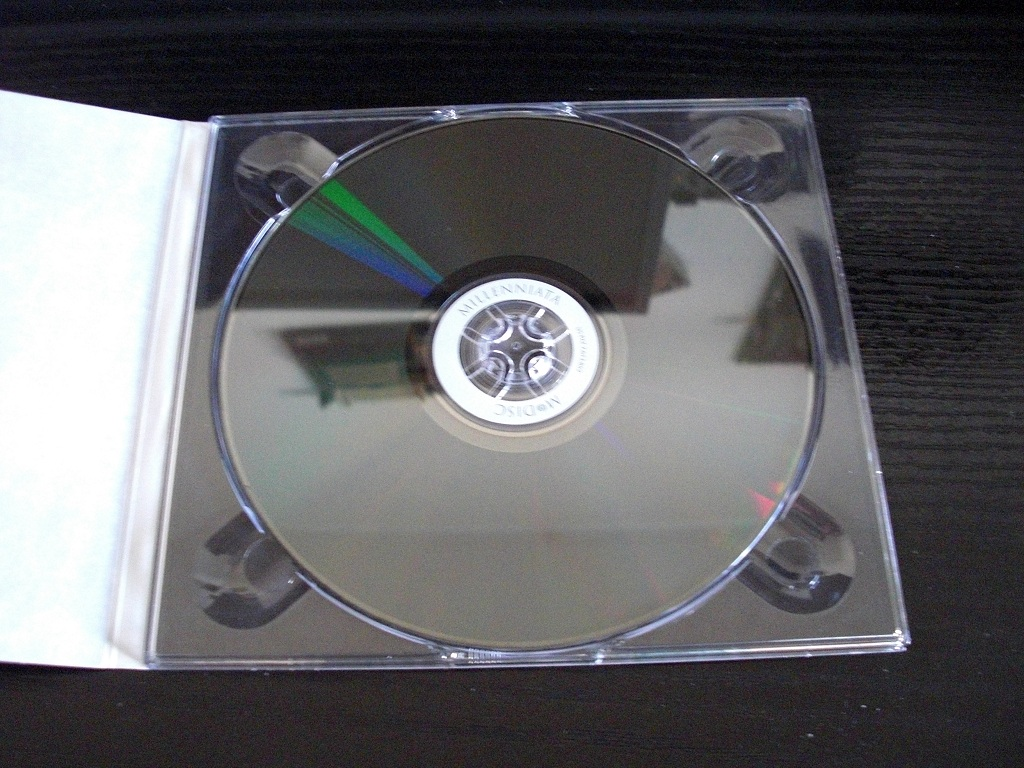
M-DISC (DVD) medium in an open case

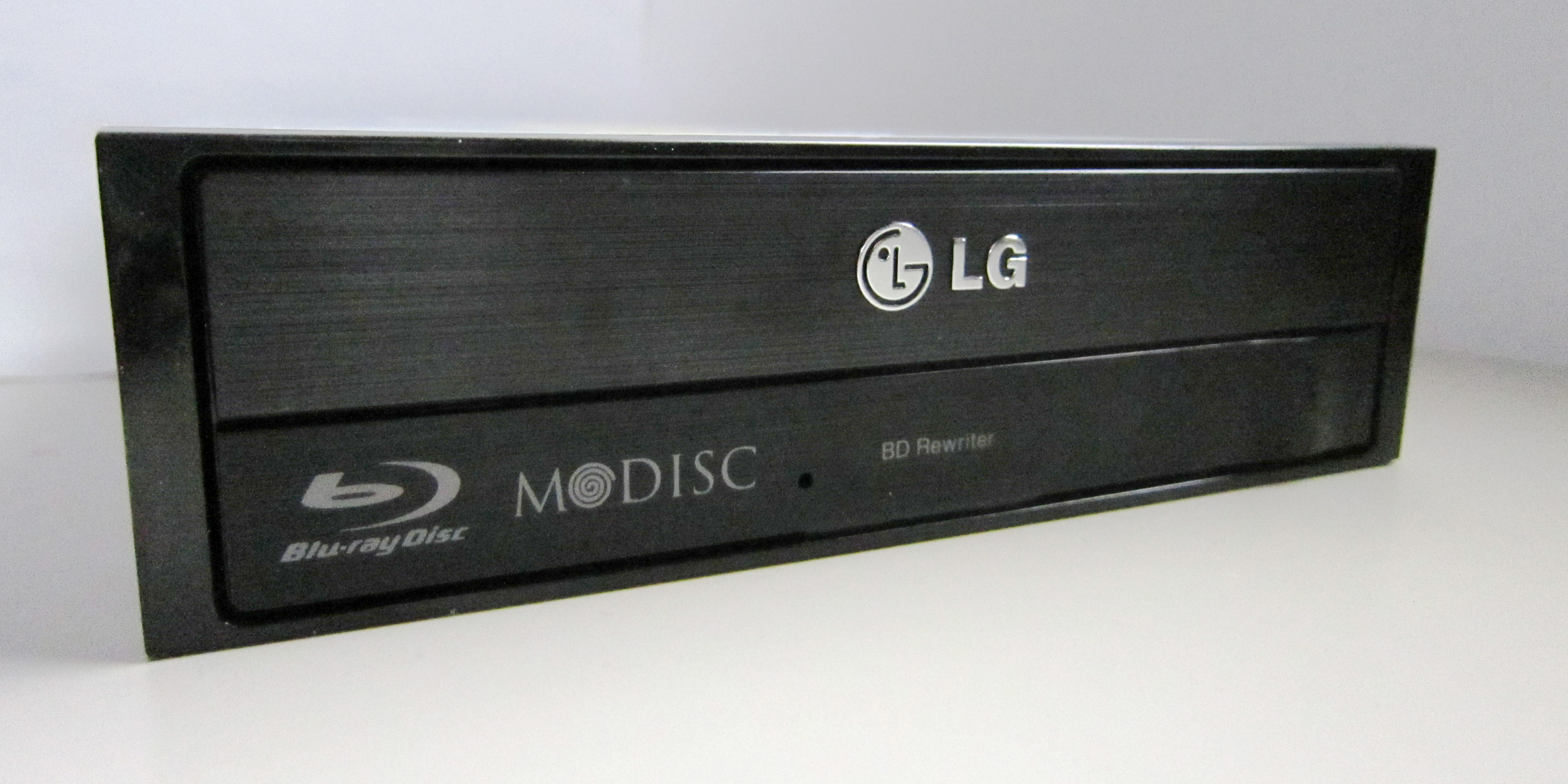
The M-DISC "swirl" logo on an LG Blu-ray optical drive

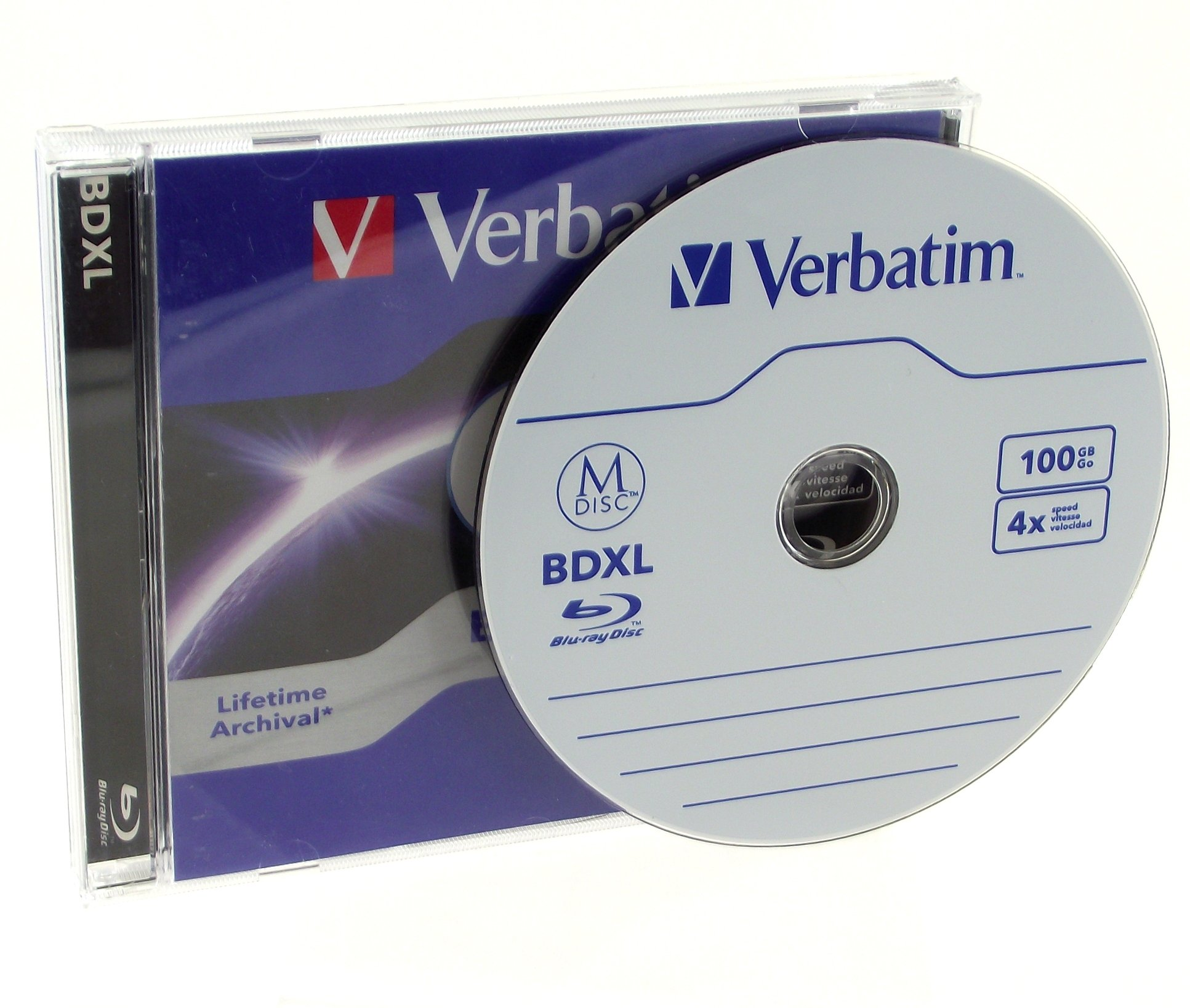
A Verbatim M-Disc BDXL 100GB in front of the jewel case

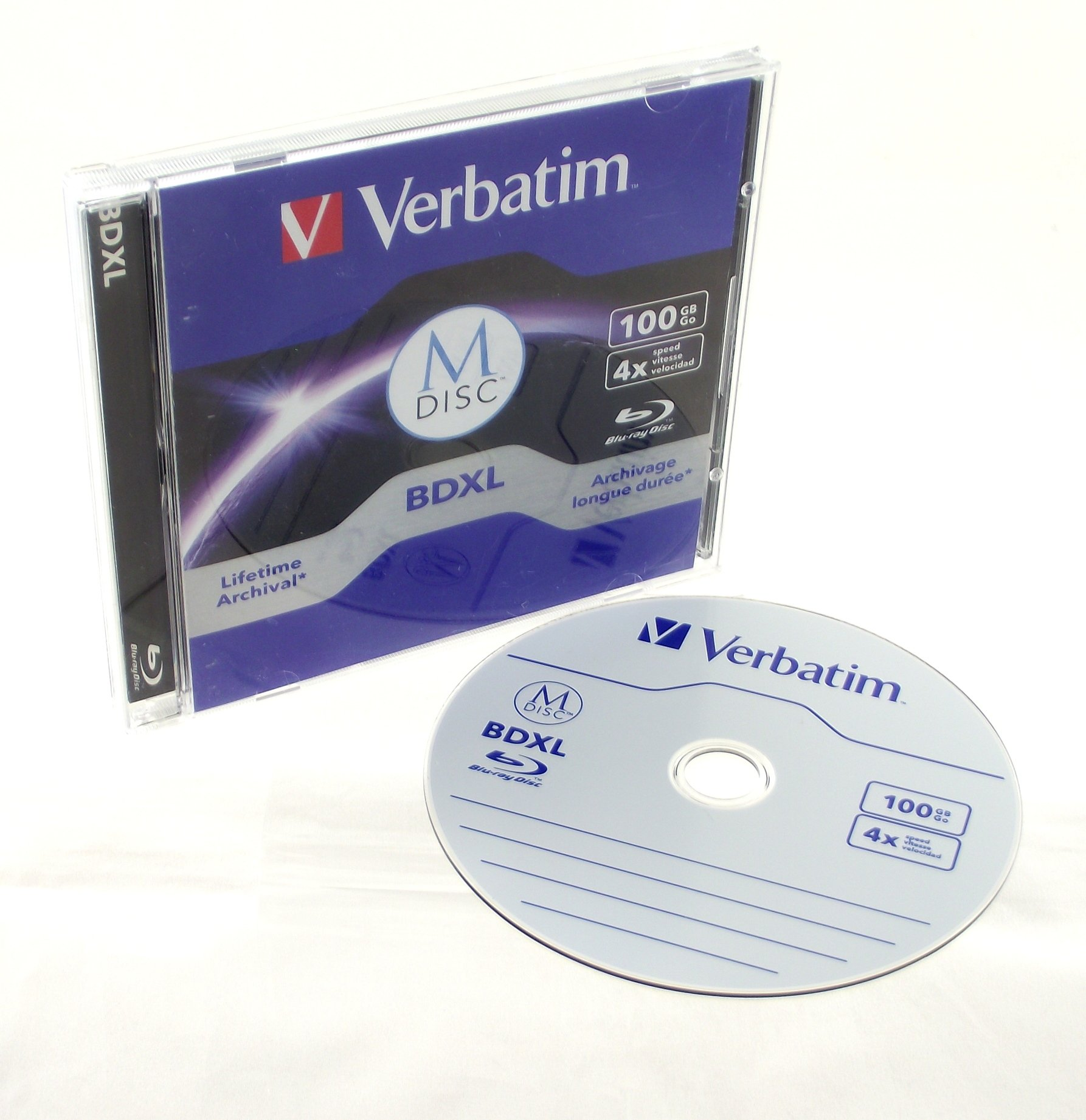
A Verbatim M-Disc BDXL 100GB in front of the jewel case

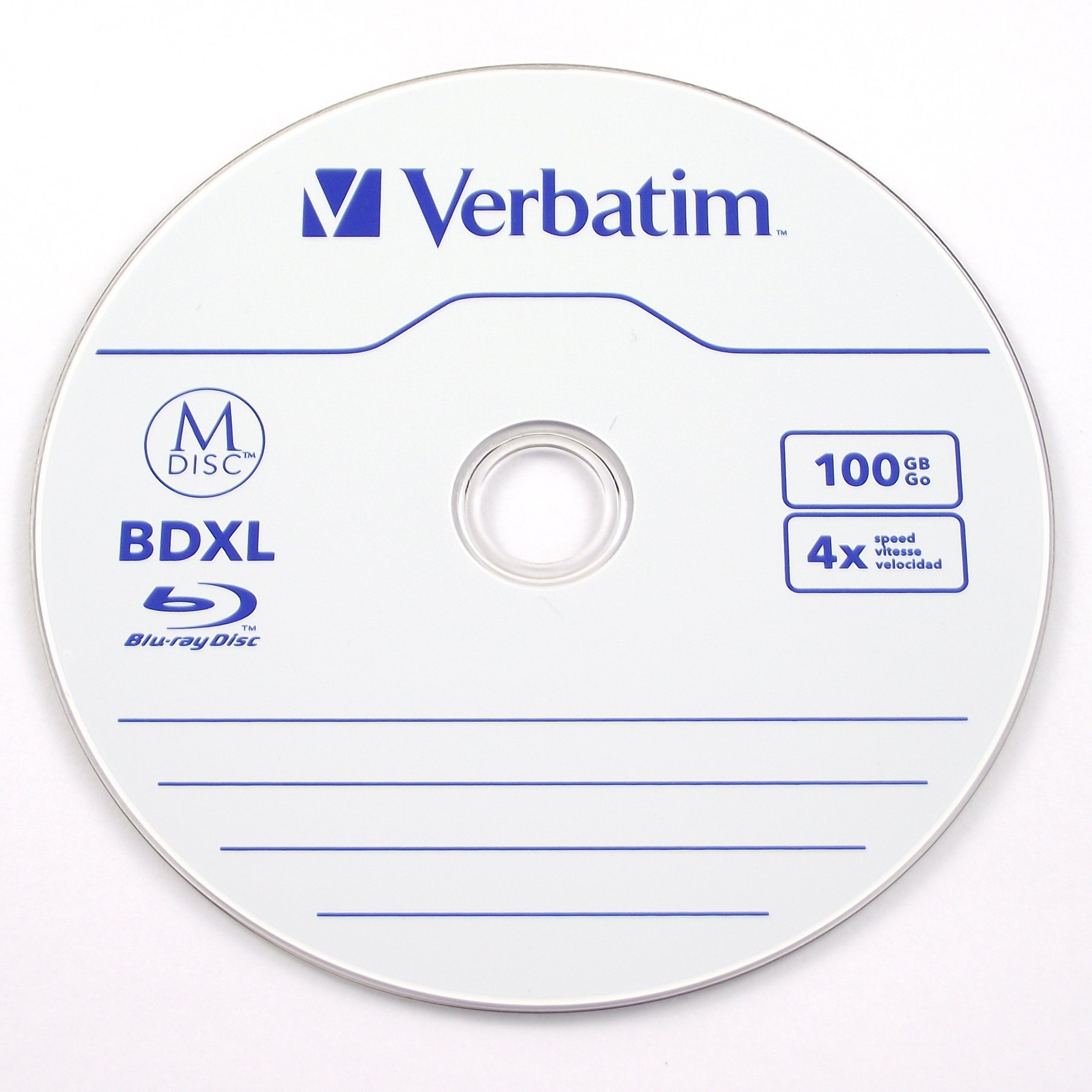
A Verbatim M-Disc BDXL 100GB

== Notes ==
Accelerated thermal tests are only representative from a materials science perspective, this data is mostly used for manufacturing development. These discs would never pass 50 °C in real-world situations as even basic burial archival depth of 1–2 meters would keep them below 20 °C.

- Ideal storage condition, e.g., 15 °C and 10% RH
- Controlled storage condition, e.g., 25 °C and 50% RH, using the Eyring model
- Uncontrolled storage condition, e.g., 30 °C and 80% RH, using the Arrhenius model
