= MDISC =

MDISC can refer to

- M-DISC, an optical media technology
- McDonnell Douglas Information Systems Company (MDISC), former owner of the Tymnet network
