= Optimized power control =

Optimized Power Control, also known as Optimum Power Calibration, abbreviated OPC, is a function of optical disc recorders.

It checks the proper writing power and reflection of the media in use, calculating the optimum laser power and adjusting it for writing the particular session. More sophisticated is Active OPC or Running OPC. Active OPC monitors writing power and reflection of the media in use, calculating the optimum laser power and adjusting it in real-time, which, in theory, should result in a better quality burn.

== See also ==
- Optical disc recording technologies
- Write strategy
