= Harold T. Martin =

American citizen accused of stealing digital data from the NSA

Harold Martin
- Born: Harold Thomas Martin III; November 1964 (age 61)
- Other name: Hal
- Education: University of Wisconsin-Madison (BS); George Mason University (MA); University of Maryland, Baltimore County (PhD, incomplete)
- Occupation: Computer engineer
- Years active: late 1990s – August 31, 2016
- Employers: National Security Agency; Booz Allen Hamilton; U.S. Department of Defense
- Known for: Theft of classified information
- Spouses: Elizabeth Martin (div.); Marina Martin (div.); Deborah Shaw
- Status: Paroled, previously incarcerated at Federal Medical Center, Devens; FBP Register #62332-037
- Motive: Digital hoarding or espionage
- Conviction: July 19, 2019 (pleaded guilty)
- Criminal charges: Willful retention of National Defense Information (18 USC § 793
- Penalty: 9-year prison term, three year supervised release, $250,000 fine

Details
- Date apprehended: August 31, 2016

Harold Thomas Martin III (born November 1964) is an American computer scientist and former contractor for Booz Allen Hamilton who in 2019 pleaded guilty to illegally removing 50 terabytes of classified information from the National Security Agency. The motive for the crime has been a subject of debate, investigators reportedly had difficulty determining if Martin was engaged in espionage or digital hoarding since throughout his decades of work, he appeared not to have ever accessed any of the files once he removed them from government facilities.

== Career ==
Martin earned a bachelor's degree in economics and math from the University of Wisconsin-Madison in 1989, and commissioned as a Surface Warfare Officer in the U.S. Navy upon graduation. He served in the Navy from 1987 until 2000, deploying to the Red Sea on the USS Seattle (AOE-3), during Operation Desert Storm. During the later part of his military service he transferred to a part time role in the Navy Reserve, which was when he first received access to classified data. Upon leaving the military, Martin remained in the D.C. metro area, continuing his education with a master's degree in information systems from George Mason University in 2004, and maintaining his security clearance working for government contractors including Computer Sciences Corporation and Tenacity Solutions. He was later hired by defense staffing giant Booz Allen Hamilton, tasked to the National Security Agency from 2012 to 2015, during which time he worked with the elite Tailored Access Operations unit, albeit in a support capacity. In 2015, while still a contractor for Booz Allen, Martin moved to the Pentagon's Office of Acquisition, Technology and Logistics (AT&L), working at a Department of Defense facility in Alexandria, Virginia up until his arrest in 2016.

At the time of his arrest in August 2016, Martin was pursuing a Doctor of Computer Science degree from the University of Maryland, Baltimore County. His research area was "Virtual Interfaces for Exploration of Heterogeneous & Cloud Computing Architectures." Roy Rada, a retired professor at UMBC who mentored Martin early in his doctoral research, told The New York Times that Martin had been very interested in post-traumatic stress disorder (PTSD) and how to diagnose it quickly using eye tracking. Rada reported that Martin believed that he had many of the symptoms of PTSD, possibly a result of his service in the Gulf, and sought funding from military health agencies to carry out a major research project on PTSD diagnoses, though his proposals were not funded.

The New York Times described Martin as an "introverted loner," citing a former colleague's description of a man with a "sort of Walter Mitty-complex" which drove him to engage in fantasticism and grandiose delusions. The source recounted that Martin once traveled to Georgia to purchase a retired police car, still equipped with a spotlight and other overt police equipment, saying "he just always wanted to be important." "He always thought of himself like a James Bond-type person, wanting to save the world from computer evil," said another. According to The Times, though outwardly introverted, online Martin feigned a militant confidence about the future of cyberwarfare, writing "the battles ahead will require a special breed of warrior." Of his work, he wrote "It’s really a calling, and something the individual has to want to do as a profession, due to the sacrifices required to be top flight in this new, electronic, version of the great game."

== Arrest ==
While attempting to trace the source of the Shadow Brokers leak in the summer of 2016, the Federal Bureau of Investigation (FBI) was alerted by the NSA to a post made by Martin, who allegedly communicated via the Twitter account @HAL_999999999. Martin used Twitter to contact Kaspersky Lab, a Russian cyber-security firm, which in turn alerted the National Security Agency. The FBI originally believed Martin to be the source of the Shadow Brokers thefts of NSA hacking tools, and used the information provided by Kaspersky researchers to execute a search warrant on Martin's modest residence in suburban Glen Burnie, Maryland in August 2016, deploying a SWAT team, setting up roadblocks, breaking down the front door with a battering ram, and deploying flash bangs inside the house before removing Martin at gunpoint. The FBI and Maryland State Police reported discovering over 50 terabytes of classified data within the residence, in an unlocked shed, and within Martin's personal vehicle.

According to the prosecution's indictment, Martin stole materials from the Central Intelligence Agency, the National Security Agency, United States Cyber Command, the Department of Defense and the National Reconnaissance Office. According to prosecutors, there was no evidence that Martin ever actually accessed any of the files he stole.

Martin reportedly stole the information simply by walking out of his various secure workplaces with it in his possession. Prosecutors stated that the stolen classified information included the names of covert intelligence officers.

== Trial and sentencing ==
Martin was charged by the United States Department of Justice with "willful retention of national defense information". Martin entered a plea of not guilty. In an October 2016 hearing at the United States District Court for the District of Maryland, Magistrate Judge A. David Copperthite sided with the prosecution in agreeing that Martin was a flight risk and would not be released pending trial.

The FBI's failure to provide Martin with a Miranda warning prior to questioning by the SWAT team led to U.S. District Court Judge Richard Bennett rendering many of Martin's statements as inadmissible. Martin's defense attorneys argued that he suffered from mental health issues, of which his hoarding was a symptom.

Martin agreed to plead guilty in December 2017. This was scheduled to occur on January 22, 2018. Martin instead pled not guilty. According to the court's memorandum opinion dated December 3, 2018, Martin's trial date was scheduled for June 17, 2019. On March 17, 2019, Martin agreed to plead guilty to Willful Retention of National Defense Information (18 U.S. Code § 793). The agreement ultimately called for nine years in prison, three years supervised release and a fine of up to $250,000, which represent the maximum punishment recommended for that crime under federal sentencing guidelines.

On July 19, 2019, Martin was sentenced to nine years in prison. At sentencing, Martin apologized before Judge Bennett, and said he recognized that taking the data was wrong. Bennett remarked that the case "has given me great pause," but agreed to impose the nine-year term negotiated between the parties, with three years subtracted for time already served.

== Imprisonment ==
Martin was housed at Federal Medical Center, Devens, a facility for federal inmates with ongoing long term physical or mental health treatment needs, located in Devens, Massachusetts. According to the Bureau of Prisons website, Martin was released May 24, 2024.
