= Digital hoarding =

Excessive acquisition of digital material

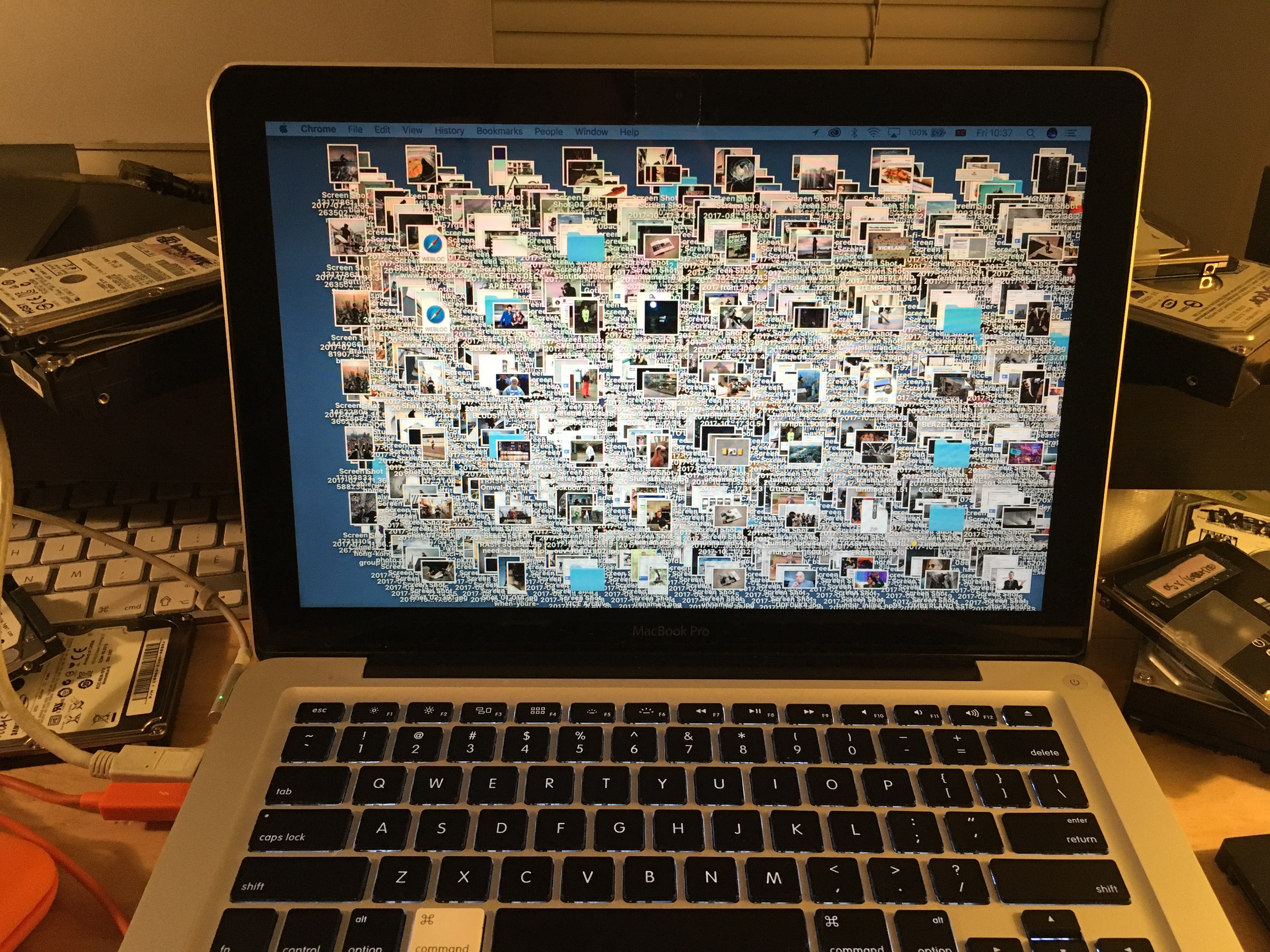
An extremely cluttered computer desktop, a common example of digital hoarding

Digital hoarding (also known as e-hoarding, e-clutter, data hoarding, digital pack-rattery or cyber hoarding) is defined by researchers as an emerging sub-type of hoarding disorder characterized by individuals collecting excessive digital material which leads to those individuals experiencing stress and disorganization. Digital hoarding takes place in electronic environments where information is stored digitally. The term initially gained popularity among online forums and in the media before receiving scholarly attention. Research indicates there may be correlation between individuals who exhibit physical and digital hoarding behaviors and acknowledges there is a lack of psychological literature on the subject.

Several studies suggest the main influential factors of digital hoarding are related to a number of issues and personal reasons which includes reduced costs for storing data, individuals lacking time to curate accumulated data, the perceived lifespan of data and emotional attachment to digital assets. The studies conducted to examine digital hoarding are limited in scope as this is an emerging area of study. There is a lack of agreement among researchers about whether digital hoarding is a condition to be treated rather than a normal human activity.

The term data hoarding is also used to describe the (non-pathological) archiving of large amounts of data that might otherwise be lost, such as old video games and websites. Due to the massive 2025 United States government online resource removals, data hoarding as loss prevention gained much attention.

Data hoarding differs from commercial and governmental digital hoarding activities such as data collection and data mining, which are hoarded for the purposes of AI training, targeted advertising and mass surveillance.

Datahoarding-behavior can be observed in various digital spaces such as the social media Reddit's datahoarder community (/r/DataHoarder). In 2018, the community collectively archived approximately 25 terabytes of pornographic images from the microblogging site Tumblr after it was announced the site would impose a ban on NSFW material. On the 6th of October 2025, a member of Reddit's datahoarder community created an organized database of the Epstein files.

== Behavioral influences ==
The limited studies published that focus on examining digital hoarding behavior identified the following influential factors as having significant impact on an individual's decision to accumulate digital material:

- Some individuals experience anxiety when faced with disposing of digital items, particularly if they fear losing something important.
- Many digital hoarders don't know how to organize their digital content or aren't in the habit of doing so, and they lack a methodology for determining which content is worth keeping.
- Natural creative motives such as the desire to share ideas.
- Perceptions around the need or usefulness of digital assets in the future
  - Perceiving digital assets will be needed in the future
  - Uncertainty around what data will be needed in the future
- Lacking motivation to manage digital assets
- Time constraints
  - Keeping all of one's digital files requires less time and effort than evaluating and deleting them.

Researchers cite the following developments in technology as playing a role in enabling the increased accumulation of digital material:

- Existence of hardware and software for creating digital content
- Development of digital storage capacity

== Research findings ==
The increasing availability of digital materials coincides with increased opportunity for people to accumulate digital materials. Van Bennekom et al. introduced "digital hoarding" in scientific literature in 2015 after reading descriptions of it published on the Internet by both patients and professionals. They define it as "the accumulation of digital files to the point of loss of perspective, which eventually results in stress and disorganization." Since the publication of this case study, several attempts have been made to study digital hoarding. In each of these publications there are clear knowledge gaps identified citing the need of more research to better understand digital hoarding.

Sweeten et al. conducted one of the first research projects in 2018 that focused on digital hoarding, examining characteristics and potential problems associated with digital hoarding. They identified five barriers to deleting digital data including: keeping data for the future/just in case, keeping data as evidence, lazy/time-consuming, emotional attachment to data, not my server-not my problem. They also identified four problems associated with accumulating excessive amounts of data including: effects on productivity, effects on psychological wellbeing, cybersecurity issues, links with physical hoarding. Participants in this study were frequently surprised by how much data they accumulated yet still experienced difficulties when discussing discarding that information. This study of digital hoarding was limited by a small sample of participants and the absence of an agreed upon standardized scale to measure digital hoarding behavior.

Vitale et al. published another early research project in 2018 investigating digital data perceptions among a small sample of individuals with diverse backgrounds. This research focused on what digital items individuals held onto for multiple years and the criteria used to determine why and how those digital items were considered worth saving. The researchers used hoarding and minimalism as two extremes to discuss the spectrum of tendencies uncovered during interviews as they found these tendencies required context for understanding and not fitted for binary categorization.

In addition to bringing attention to hoarding tendencies, Vitale et al.'s research compared and contrasted these tendencies as they relate to identity construction. Dillon suggests within the spectrum Vitale et al. established with hoarding and minimalism as extremes at each end, most human engagement with digital and physical objects falls in between those two extremes.

Published studies focused on digital hoarding include adult participants and no children. One researcher in search of ways to apply what is known about adult hoarding to identifying and treating hoarding behavior exhibited by children suggested further research into digital hoarding behavior among children.

=== Constraints ===
The focus of existing studies on digital hoarding are narrow in scope, typically focusing on determining what differences and similarities exist between people's reasons to accumulate digital material in a work setting vs private setting. This boundary between work vs personal information spaces is becoming increasingly difficult to sustain prompting some archivists to suggest work and personal information could merge into personal record keeping. Other limitations include small sample research groups and a lack of agreed upon metrics to fully measure the aspects of digital hoarding behavior.

== Common hoarding sites ==
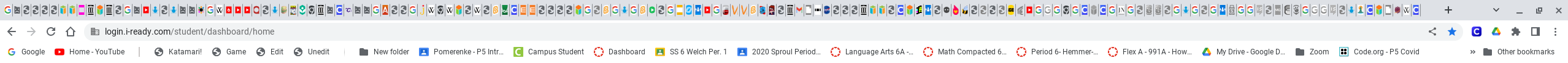
The tab bar on Chromium of a browser tab hoarder

Digital hoarding occurs in any electronic spaces where information is stored. These are common areas where digital clutter may exist:

- Browser windows and tabs
- Excessive desktop icons
- Digital images
- Old documents
- File folders
- Email inboxes
- Internet bookmarks no longer being referenced
- Music and video files
- Old software/computer programs/apps no longer being used
- Social media/Online game "friends" and "following"

Some social media platforms also provide opportunity for digital hoarding. On the social networking site Facebook, for example, one can accumulate a vast number of “friends”, even reaching the maximum limit of 5000 for example, that may merely be acquaintances or lapsed contacts or even complete strangers. Groups and Pages can also contribute to clutter when users join and like new ones, respectively, without leaving or unfollowing those in which they are no longer interested.

== Motivations ==
Digital hoarding stems from a variety of individual traits and habits, corporate conditions, and societal trends:

- People are tired of seeing ads, manipulating apps and counting on an internet connection. They want something that "Just works". This has led to the creation of "Movie hoarding apps" that mimic a netflix style graphical user interface.
- Many businesses rely on email correspondence for decision-making and formal approvals. As a result, employees often hoard work emails in the event it is required to verify a future decision.
- Developments in data storage technology result in digital hoarding as individuals and companies lack a need to optimize storage space.
- The widespread availability and rapid dissemination of open content on the Internet makes it easier for users to obtain and hoard digital media.
- Digital media's lack of physicality make it so they're less likely to be perceived as clutter, making it so digital hoarders do not see the extent of what they own.
- Unlike many physical items, electronic content can take years to decay and often goes unnoticed, so users must consciously choose to delete it.

== Repercussions ==
Digital hoarding can lead to potential issues:

- Digital clutter can be mentally draining, requiring time and attention. For example, hoarded emails can make an inbox seem overwhelming unless emails are archived when filtered. The user wastes time sifting through excess emails, which can result in lowered employee productivity.
- Digital hoarding can create an unhealthy attachment to digital content and foster a sort of “media addiction.” It is often good for one's mental health to let go of useless clutter, and decluttering digital devices can help with decluttering the mind.
- Excessive digital content takes up more hard drive space than it merits, and may even require the addition of extra digital storage to one's computer or mobile phone.
- Server farms use more electricity as they need more disk drives. The extra load is especially notable in corporate domains. This adds to an individual's or company's electricity expenses if self hosted and carbon footprint if stored on a server.

== Positive reasoning ==
From the few studies that have specifically examined digital hoarding, participants cite their reasoning for saving many digital files is due to the lack of physical space it takes up. Siddick et al. examined carbon and water footprints of data centers located in the United States noting a lack of transparency surrounding the role of data centers in handling data, obscuring the environmental implications of data centers from the public eye.

== Media coverage ==
Many American documentary television series depict the struggles of compulsive hoarders, such as Hoarding: Buried Alive on TLC and Hoarders on A&E. These shows have popularized awareness of hoarding, showing the consequences of accumulating clutter. However, these programs usually focus on physical hoarding. The WPTV story of Larry Fisher, a resident of Fort Lauderdale, Florida, is a notable exception. This program focused on digital hoarding, depicting Fisher's longstanding refusal to delete any digital content. Instead, Fisher purchased an additional computer every time he ran out of hard drive space. The BBC News story of Washington, D.C., resident Chris Yurista expresses a counterpoint to this perspective. The program portrayed Yurista as a "21st century minimalist" for living with hardly any physical assets, substituting digital goods wherever possible.

== Related concepts ==
Digital clutter is the term often used to describe the resulting (digital) artifacts of digital hoarding, but it should not be understood as exclusively the result of hoarding. Digital clutter can be created as a side-effect of high occurrences of another user activity, such as the computer desktop icons created through frequent installation of applications. In such a case the clutter does not reflect the user's intent to hoard.

Housekeeping is the term often used to refer to the activity by which digital clutter moves out of the 'clutter' designation, either by being thrown away, being organised, or by the recognition of its importance, thus no longer making it part of the 'clutter'.

Gadget hoarding is the excessive hoarding of electronic hardware including computers, cellphones, wires and cables, VCR and DVD players, audio equipment, routers, and tablets; it can occur in individuals alongside digital hoarding.

== See also ==
- Digital preservation
- Harold T. Martin III – convicted of stealing 50 terabytes of data from the National Security Agency (NSA) with an alleged motive of digital hoarding.
- M-DISC
- Web archiving
