= Optical Storage Technology Association =

The OSTA's website logo

The Optical Storage Technology Association (OSTA) was an international trade association formed to promote the use of recordable optical data storage technologies and products. It was responsible for the creation and maintenance of the Universal Disk Format (UDF) file system specification (derived from ISO/IEC 13346 and ECMA-167), which was notably adopted for DVD-Video. It was incorporated in California in 1992 and dissolved in 2018.

In the autumn of 2007, OSTA spearheaded a campaign to encourage families and photographers to back up their digital photographs on compact discs.

The web site of the association provides the full digital specification books of each revision of the Universal Disc Format (UDF) starting at 1.02, as well as other whitepapers and information pages related to optical data storage. Besides the UDF specifications, differences between the revisions of the specifications can be obtained. A sub-committee of the group was the "Commercial Optical Storage Applications Group" (COSA), which helped companies implement long-term archival on optical media.

== In popular culture ==
In 2003, the MythBusters visited David Bunzel at the OSTA for an experiment, in which the speed at which discs can be spun before shattering was tested. The episode erronously makes the claim that a CD spinning at "52×" speed spins at 30,000 rotations per minute. The error stems from assuming a linear velocity of 52× at the innermost edge of the data area of the disc (see CD-ROM § speed table).
