= InCD =

UDF packet writing software for Windows

InCD is a packet writing software developed by Nero AG for Microsoft Windows.

InCD allows optical discs to be used in a similar manner to a floppy disk. The user can drag and drop files to and from the disk using Windows Explorer, or open and save files on the disk directly from application programs.

It supports rewritable media (CD-RW, DVD+RW, DVD-RW, DVD-RAM, CD-MRW and DVD+MRW), and from InCD 5.5 on also writing to write-once media CD-R, DVD+R, DVD-R. Current version 6.6.5100 is free and provides Windows XP functionality similar to Live File System in Windows Vista and Windows 7.

InCD formats media, and writes to Universal Disk Format. Systems which do not support UDF (such as Windows 98) will only present a HTML page (stored on the disk, outside the UDF part), explaining the problem and linking to a free UDF reader software.

== InCD Reader ==
InCD 5 Reader is a program that allows users to read discs written in MRW format on systems that do not support MRW as well as discs written in a UDF format that are not natively supported by your operating system. Since January 2007 InCD 5 Reader includes support for SecurDisc: with InCD 5 Reader installed, a user can access the protected content of a SecurDisc disc on a drive that does not necessarily support this technology. The user is then given the possibility to provide the content encryption password, verify the digital signature of the disc, etc.

== Problems ==
Old and hardware incompatible versions of InCD can cause the Windows XP "Reboot on Shutdown" problem similar to those quoted with Roxio Easy CD Creator.

InCD is not compatible with the addon for writing CD's that's installed by Windows Media Player 7.x.

== See also ==
- Features new to Windows Vista § UDF packet writing (Live File System)
  - Live File System

Techniques used by InCD:

- Mount Rainier (packet writing)
- Universal Disk Format

Competing applications:

- Drag-to-Disc (formerly DirectCD)
- Drive Letter Access

Related software:

- InCD Reader
- Nero Burning ROM
