= Matthew Linford =

American chemist and professor (born 1966)

- Born: April 9, 1966 (age 60)
- Occupation: Professor of Chemistry at Brigham Young University
- Known for: X-ray photoelectron spectroscopy, Fourier denoising of spectral data, M-DISC, surface modification of silicon

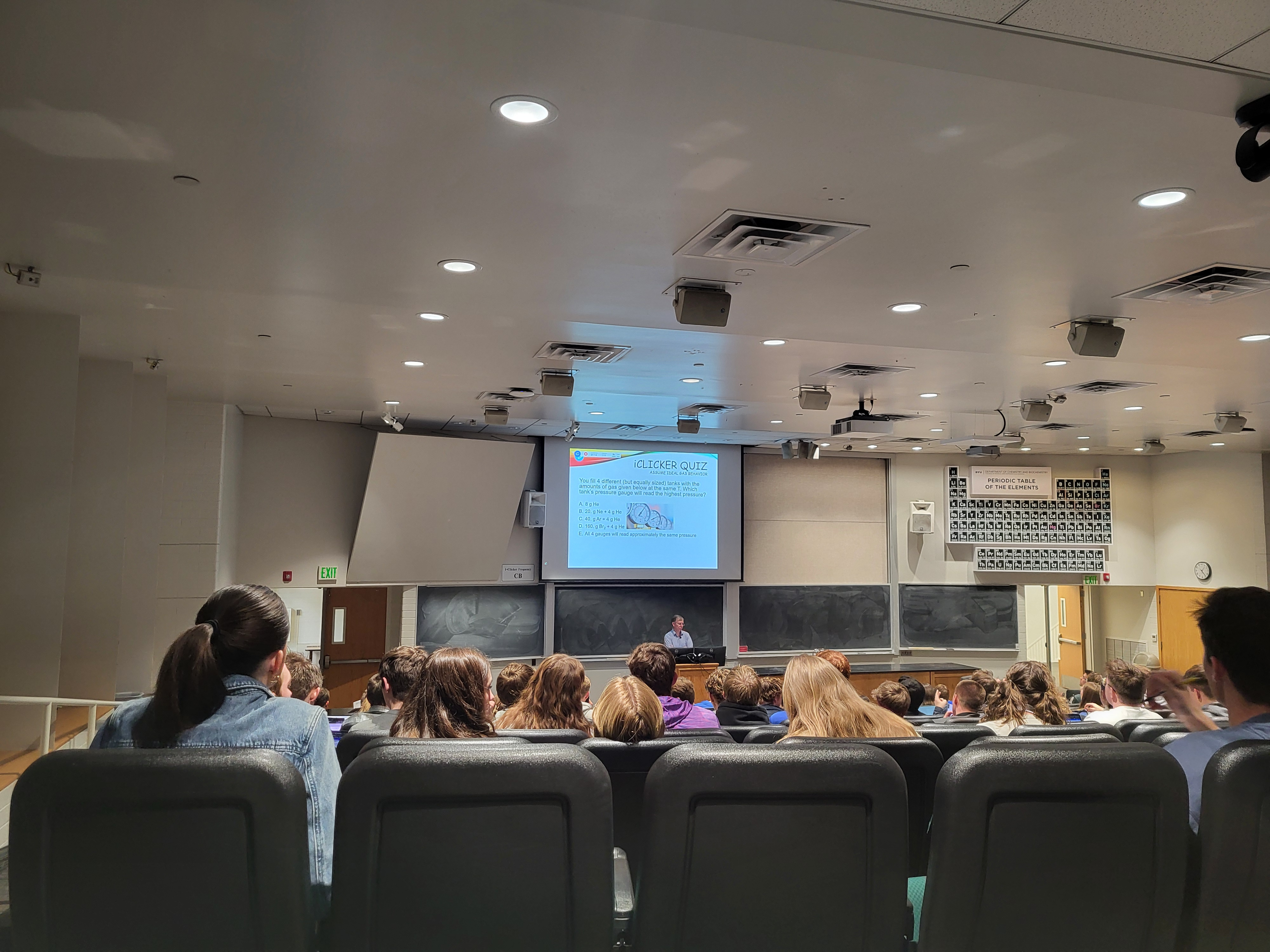
Matthew Linford leading a lecture

Matthew R. Linford (born April 9, 1966) is an American chemist and full professor in the Department of Chemistry and Biochemistry at Brigham Young University (BYU) in Provo, Utah. He joined BYU as an assistant professor in 2000 and has been a full professor since 2012. His research spans X-ray photoelectron spectroscopy (XPS), Fourier methods for spectral denoising and data science, spectroscopic ellipsometry, surface modification and characterization, chromatographic materials, and long-term optical data storage. He has more than 550 publications and over 17,000 citations.

== Academic background and career ==
Linford received a Bachelor of Science in chemistry magna cum laude from Brigham Young University in 1990. He completed a Master of Science in Materials Science and Engineering and a Doctor of Philosophy in chemistry at Stanford University in 1996, where he was advised by Christopher E. D. Chidsey. His doctoral research produced the first two published papers on alkyl monolayers on hydrogen-terminated silicon surfaces; those papers have accumulated more than 950 and 1,450 citations respectively. During graduate study he held a Hertz Fellowship from 1991 to 1996, one of the most competitive fellowships in the physical sciences and engineering in the United States. He conducted postdoctoral research at the Max Planck Institute for Colloids and Interfaces in Germany from 1996 to 1997, where he worked with Helmut Möhwald on polyelectrolyte multilayers.

Linford joined BYU as an assistant professor in 2000 and became a full professor in 2012. As of 2024, his Google Scholar profile lists more than 17,120 citations, an h-index of 57, and an i10-index of 230. He has approximately 550 publications, including peer-reviewed papers, book chapters, conference proceedings, peer-reviewed contributions to spectral databases, tutorial articles, and more than 40 patents.

His research group has worked on XPS peak fitting, Fourier-domain denoising of spectral data, spectroscopic ellipsometry, principal component analysis (PCA), multivariate curve resolution (MCR), atomic layer deposition, new materials for chromatographic separations, chemomechanical functionalization of silicon, and materials for long-term optical data storage. A 2025 paper in the Journal of Vacuum Science and Technology A established the peer-reviewed methodology underlying the group's Fourier-based XPS denoising approach.

In 2015 Linford was named an Alcuin Fellow at Brigham Young University, an honor for outstanding teacher-scholars whose work transcends disciplinary boundaries. He was named a Fellow of the American Vacuum Society (AVS) in 2014.

Linford has been a contributing editor for Vacuum Technology & Coating since 2014, for which he has authored more than 100 columns on surface and material characterization. He served as an editor for Applied Surface Science (Elsevier) from 2015 to 2023, handling more than 1,600 manuscripts. He was an associate editor of Surface Science Spectra from 2003 to 2019 and joined its editorial board in 2019. He also serves on the editorial boards of Separations and Hybrid Advances.

== Industrial experience ==
Prior to joining BYU, Linford worked in industry for three years. As a senior scientist at Rohm and Haas Company (1997–1998), he developed an infrared tool for rapid catalyst screening and designed a laser scanner for detecting defects in plastic sheets used as flat panel display substrates. As a senior scientist at Praelux, Inc. (1998–1999), he developed methods to immobilize nucleotides and DNA oligomers onto surfaces and procedures to attach nickel NTA chelators to glass coverslips for 6-His-tagged protein binding.

As director of research at Nano-Tex, LLC (1999–2000), Linford developed the product "Nano-Dry," a hydrophobic treatment that makes nylon and polyester more hydrophilic and comfortable to wear. The product was marketed nationally and became part of the Nike golf collection; Tiger Woods is shown wearing pants with the Nano-Dry finish in the October 2003 issue of Golf Digest. He was named as inventor on more than 10 patents from his work at Nano-Tex.

== Companies founded ==
Linford has co-founded several companies:

- Laser Array Technologies (2006–2011) developed microlens laser patterning of surfaces for bioarray fabrication.
- Millenniata, Inc. (founded 2007) developed M-DISC, a write-once optical disc technology. The company produced a DVD rated for more than 1,000 years of data retention and a Blu-ray disc rated for at least 300 years; the products were sold commercially by Verbatim. Linford served on Millenniata's board from June 2007 to April 2010.
- Xeromax, Inc. (2009–2011) received the "Outstanding Product" award at the Global Moot Corp competition at the University of Texas at Austin in 2009, as well as First Place at the BYU Business Plan Competition and Second Place at the Wake Forest Elevator Pitch Competition.
- NanoXCoatings and NanoXChromatography (founded 2020) licensed BYU-developed chromatography technology; their diamond-based high-performance liquid chromatography column was sold by Diamond Analytics.
- Fourier-AI Innovations, LLC (founded 2026) is a BYU spinout developing software for automated Fourier-domain denoising of XPS spectra, including the patent-pending Binary Residual Map™ visualization tool.

== Honors and awards ==
- Hertz Fellow, Stanford University (1991–1996)
- BYU Technology Transfer Award (August 25, 2009)
- Fellow of the American Vacuum Society (2014)
- Alcuin Fellow, Brigham Young University (2015) — awarded for outstanding teacher-scholars whose work transcends disciplinary boundaries
