= Germanium nitride =

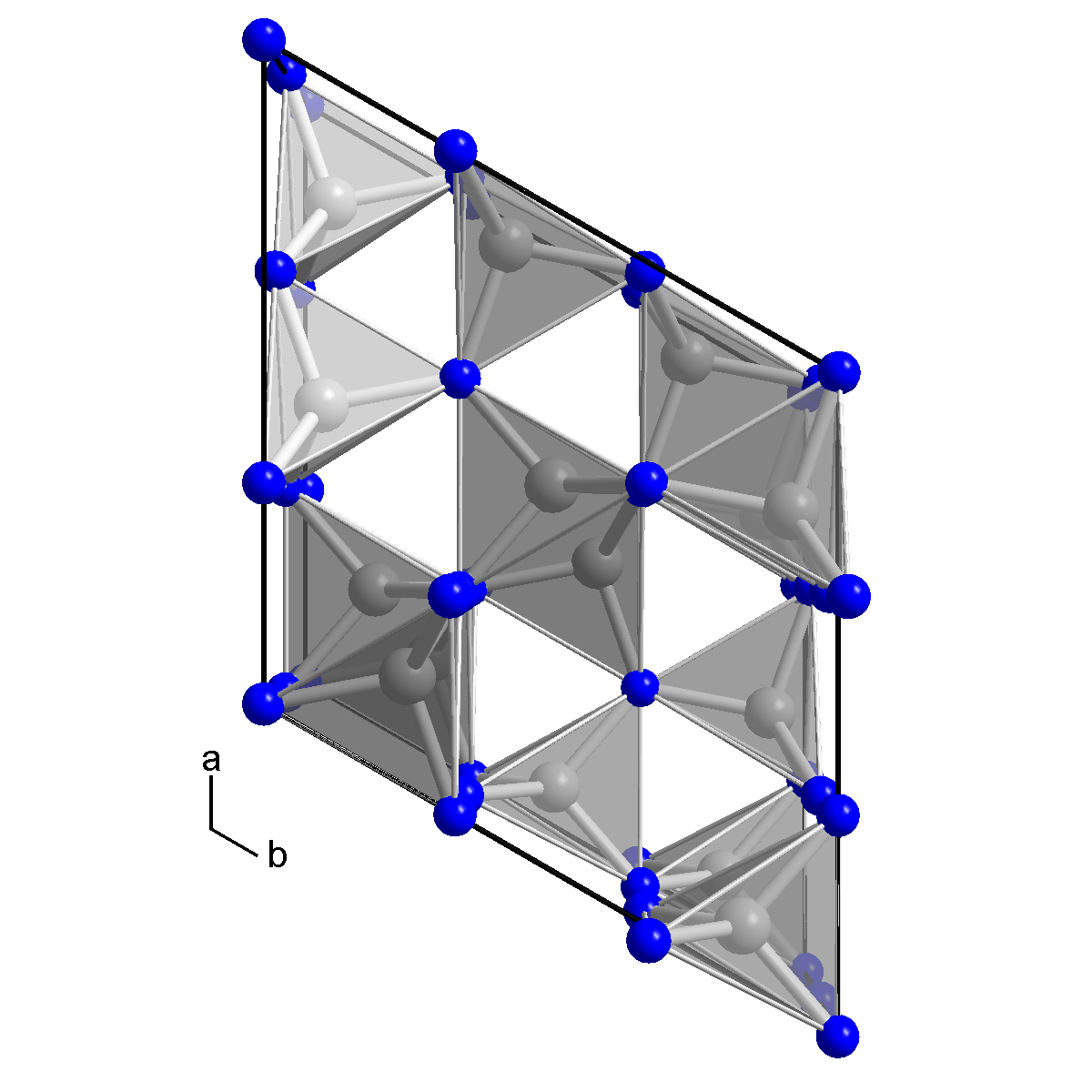

Names
- IUPAC name Germanium(IV) nitride

Identifiers
CAS Number	12065-36-0
3D model (JSmol)	Interactive image
ChemSpider	17617086
ECHA InfoCard	100.031.864
PubChem CID	16684757
CompTox Dashboard (EPA)	DTXSID00923508
- InChI: InChI=1S/Ge3N4/c4-1-7(2-5)3-6 Key: BIXHRBFZLLFBFL-UHFFFAOYSA-N; InChI=1/Ge3N4/c4-1-7(2-5)3-6 Key: BIXHRBFZLLFBFL-UHFFFAOYAE
- SMILES: N#[Ge]N([Ge]#N)[Ge]#N

Properties
Chemical formula	Ge_{3}N_{4}
Molar mass	273.947 g/mol
Appearance	Colorless crystalline solid
Density	5.25 g/cm^{3}
Boiling point	900 °C (1,650 °F; 1,170 K) (decomposes)

Related compounds
Other anions	Germanium phosphide
Other cations	Carbon nitride Silicon nitride Gallium nitride
- Except where otherwise noted, data are given for materials in their standard state (at 25 °C [77 °F], 100 kPa). Infobox references

Germanium(IV) nitride is an inorganic compound with the chemical formula Ge_{3}N_{4}. It can be produced through the reaction of germanium and ammonia:

3 Ge + 4 NH_{3} → Ge_{3}N_{4} + 6 H_{2}

== Structure ==
In its pure state, germanium(IV) nitride is a colorless, inert solid that crystallizes in many polymorphs, of which the most stable is the trigonal β-form (space group P31c). In this structure, the germanium atoms are tetrahedrally coordinated while the nitrogen atoms are trigonal planar. The γ-form, which forms under high pressure, has a spinel structure.
