= Write strategy =

Parameters in DVD authoring

In DVD authoring, a write strategy is a set of low-level parameters that enables an optical disc drive to write on a specific type of blank media according to its optimum specifications. The media type is identified by the manufacturer and media ID, which is often unrelated to the brand of the media due to rebadging. Write strategies are essential for compatibility with various types of blank media, and are typically stored in the drive's firmware. If a drive lacks a write strategy for a media type, it will only be able to write using minimum speed. Drive manufacturers typically include new or improved write strategies as part of a firmware upgrade, in order to extend or improve compatibility with blank media. In cases where official support for a drive has been discontinued or is deemed unsatisfactory, users have come up with ways to patch the write strategies by modding the drive's firmware.

== Learning ==
Many DVD-writers have a learning feature (branded with names like "smart-burn") that allows the drive to collect empirical data from its actual usage. The drive stores data from previous burns in its EEPROM, allowing it to adapt the default write strategies to account for individual drive variations, such as calibration, which may be affected by environment and age.

A newer feature contained in some DVD writers allows a drive to invent write strategies for unknown media types, ostensibly reducing its dependence on firmware to provide explicit compatibility. However, because the drive initially knows nothing of the media type, early burns are frequently of poor quality, and the media's optimal strategy may never be found. Thus, in practice, this form of learning is generally a last resort, and firmware support is preferable. An attempt to address this weakness is online learning, which allows the drives to share learned data. Branded technologies that incorporate this form of learning have been given names like "solid burn" and "hypertuning".

In either case, if the history data is reset, or if the data is skewed by a series of irregular burns, the speed and/or quality of a typical burn may not be optimal until the history is repopulated with proper result data again.

== See also ==
- Optimum Power Calibration
