= Mount Rainier (packet writing) =

Method used to write to recordable optical discs

Mount Rainier (MRW) is a format for writable optical discs which provides the packet writing and defect management. Its goal is the replacement of the floppy disk. It is named after Mount Rainier, a volcano near Seattle, Washington, United States.

Mount Rainier can be used only with drives that explicitly support it (a part of SCSI/MMC and can work over ATAPI), but works with standard CD-R, CD-RW, DVD+/-R and DVD+/-RW media.

The physical format of MRW on the disk is managed by the drive's firmware, which remaps physical drive blocks into a virtual, defect-free space. Thus, the host computer does not see the physical format of the disk, only a sequence of data blocks capable of holding any filesystem.

== Design ==
The time needed for the disk formatting is shortened to about one minute by the background formatting capabilities of the drive. Formatting allocates some sectors at the end of the disk for defect management. Defective sectors are recorded at a table in the lead-in (an administrative area) and in a copy of the table in the lead-out.

From the host computer's perspective, an MRW disc provides a defect-free block-accessible device, upon which any host supported filesystem may be written. Such filesystems may be FAT32, NTFS, etc., but the preferred format is usually UDF 1.02, as this file format is widely supported. An MRW-formatted CD-RW with a UDF filesystem gives approximately 500 MB free space.

Mt. Rainier allows write access to a disc within seconds after insertion and spin-up, even while a background formatting sequence is taking place. Before this technology, a user would have to wait for the formatting to complete before writing any data to a new disc. It is even possible to read (but not write) MRW disks without an MRW-compatible drive; A "remapper" device driver is needed, an example of which is EasyWrite Reader for Windows.

An alternative to MRW is to physically format a disc in UDF 1.5 or higher using the spared build. This is achieved by the use of specialized packet writing software, or operating systems that support UDF versions 1.5 and above. MRW capabilities overlap somewhat with that of UDF 1.5+.

Information about the exact format on disc is sparse. For a limited overview of the format on disc see.

== Advantages ==
Advantages of MRW over UDF 1.5+ include:

- fast background formatting of the media
- finer grained packet size of 2K versus 64K
- file system independence
- does not depend on the host system to perform defect management

Advantage of UDF 1.5+ over MRW include:

- more portable, as UDF 1.5+ alone does not need specialized drive hardware to write, and the computer needs neither an MRW driver for a MRW-capable optical drive nor an MRW reader for drives that are incapable of reading MRW natively, reducing software overhead.

== Operating system support ==
Mount Rainier is implemented natively in Windows Vista and Windows 7. Linux has built-in MRW support since kernel version 2.6.2 (2004). Amiga OS4 supports this natively since the first beta appeared in 2004. Support for reading this format was also added to Mac OS X. Operating systems that don't support MRW natively (notably Windows XP and prior versions) need third-party software to read and write MRW-formatted discs, and these tend to be the same packet writing utilities which allow native UDF filesystems to be written to optical media.

Some optical disc software, such as IsoBuster, can support Mount Rainier on non-MR drives.

The EasyWrite logo is the marketing symbol created by Philips for CD drives that are Mount Rainier compatible.

CD-MRW stands for Compact disc – Mount Rainier Read/Write.
