= Packet writing =

Method used to write to optical discs

Packet writing (or incremental packet writing, IPW) is an optical disc recording technology used to allow write-once and rewritable CD and DVD media to be used in a similar manner to a flash drive or memory card from within the operating system.

== Details ==
Packet writing allows users to create, modify, and delete files and directories on demand without the need to burn a whole disc. Packet writing technology achieves this by writing data in incremental blocks rather than in a single block.

Deleting files and directories of a CD-R using packet writing technology does not recover the space occupied by these objects but, rather, they are simply marked as being deleted (making them effectively hidden). Similarly, changes to files cause new instances to be created instead of replacing the original files. Because of this, the available space on a non-rewritable medium using packet writing technology will decrease every time its content is modified.

The most common file system for packet writing systems is UDF.

Due to the characteristics of optical rewritable media such as CD-RWs and DVD-RWs, the ability of data sectors to hold their contents diminishes when changing them frequently (since re-crystallized alloy de-crystallizes). To cope with this the packet writing system can remap bad sectors with good sectors as required. These bad sectors cannot be recovered by formatting the media.

== Software ==
Packet writing is most popularly implemented by Microsoft since Windows Vista, where it is referred to as the Live File System. Software implementing packet writing includes:

- Nero InCD
- Adaptec/Roxio DirectCD
- Drive Letter Access
- Linux (since 2.6.8; removed in 6.17)
- Live File System (Microsoft Windows; since Windows Vista)
