= Device Keys =

Device Keys play a role in the cryptographic key management procedure in the Advanced Access Content System (AACS) specification. This specification defines a method for protecting audiovisual entertainment content, including high-definition content.

== Introduction ==
The AACS’s cryptographic key management procedure uses Device Keys to decrypt one or more elements of a Media Key Block (MKB), in order to extract a secret Media Key (Km). A MKB is located on the physical support (the disc) together with the content of the disc encrypted. MKB enables system renewability. The MKB is generated by AACS LA, and allows all compliant devices, each using their set of secret Device Keys, to calculate the same Media Key (Km).

If a set of Device Keys is compromised in a way that threatens the integrity of the system, an updated MKB can be released that causes a device with the compromised set of Device Keys to be unable to calculate the correct Km. In this way, the compromised Device Keys are “revoked” by the new MKB.

Common Cryptographic Key Management Elements
Key or Variable	Size
Device Keys (Kd_{0},Kd_{1},…,Kd_{n-1})	128 bits each
Media Key Block (MKB)	Variable, multiple of 4 bytes
Media Key (Km)	128 bits

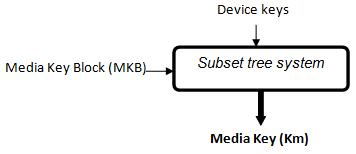
Process to obtain the Media Key, from the MKB and the Device Keys.

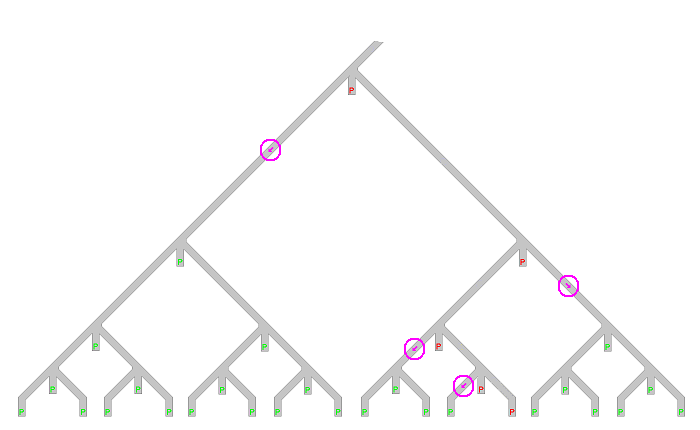
The subset difference tree approach in order to get the Processing Keys; The Devices Keys are represented in purple and the letters P corresponds to the Processing Keys: the ones in green are reachable by the given Device Keys set, and the ones in red are not.

== How it works ==
Each compliant device is given a set of secret Device Keys when manufactured. The actual number of keys may be different in different media types. These Device Keys, referred to as Kd_{i} (i=0,1,…,n-1), are provided by AACS LA. The set of Device Keys may either be unique per device, or used commonly by multiple devices. A device shall treat its Device Keys as highly confidential.

The MKB is encrypted in a subset difference tree approach. In order to decrypt it, a device must know the right Processing Key (P) which is available via the subset-difference tree process.

Essentially, the set of Device Keys are arranged in a tree such that any given Device Key can be used to find lower level Processing keys. The processing keys at higher position in the tree than the given set of Device Keys are not reachable.

A given set of Device Keys gives access to a given set of Processing keys. This way, to revoke a given Device Key, the MKB needs only be encrypted with a Processing Key which is not reachable by its Device Keys set.

== Storing ==
Each device is given its Device Keys and a 31-bit number d called the device number.

For each Device Key, there is an associated number denoted the path number, the u bit mask, and the v bit mask.

The path number denotes the position in the tree associated with the Device Key. This path number defines a path from the root to that node in the tree.

The u and v masks are used in the subset difference tree process. They are always a single sequence of 1-bits followed by a single sequence of 0-bits. The bit masks indicate don't care bits in the path number; if a bit is 0 in the mask, the corresponding bit in the path number is don't care. The deeper the position of a node in the tree, the shorter the sequence of 0-bits in the mask associated to that node.

The device number, path number, and masks denote nodes within a binary tree.

== Sources ==
- Introduction and Common Cryptographic Elements Rev 0.91
- AACS Technical Overview 7/2004

== See also ==
- History of attacks against Advanced Access Content System
- AACS encryption key controversy
