= AACS encryption key controversy =

Copyright & free speech conflict

Internet users began circulating versions of this image, calling it the Free Speech Flag, in blog posts on dozens of websites and as user avatars on forums such as Digg. The first fifteen bytes of the 09 F9 key are contained in the RGB encodings of the five colors of the stripes (precise shades of light green, dark green, pink, blue, and purple), with each color providing three bytes of the key. The byte "C0" is appended in the lower right corner due to 16 not being divisible by 3.

A controversy surrounding the AACS processing key arose in April 2007 when the Motion Picture Association of America (MPAA) and the Advanced Access Content System Licensing Administrator, LLC (AACS LA) began issuing cease and desist letters to websites publishing a 128-bit (16-byte) number, represented in hexadecimal as 09 F9 11 02 9D 74 E3 5B D8 41 56 C5 63 56 88 C0 (commonly referred to as 09 F9), a cryptographic key which enabled users to copy HD DVDs and Blu-ray Discs. The letters demanded the immediate removal of the key and any links to it, citing the anti-circumvention provisions of the United States Digital Millennium Copyright Act (DMCA).

In response to widespread Internet postings of the key, the AACS LA, the organization that controlled access to the HD DVD encryption key, issued various press statements, praising websites that complied with their requests for acting in a "responsible manner" and warning that "legal and technical tools" were adapting to the situation.

The controversy was further escalated in early May 2007, when news aggregator website Digg received a DMCA cease and desist notice and then removed numerous articles on the matter and banned users from reposting the information. This sparked what some describe as a digital revolt or "cyber-riot" in which netizens posted and spread the key on Digg, and throughout the Internet en masse, leading to a Streisand effect. The AACS LA described this situation as an "interesting new twist".

== Background ==
Because the encryption key may be used as part of circumvention technology forbidden by the DMCA, its possession and distribution has been viewed as illegal by the AACS, as well as by some legal professionals. Since it is a 128-bit numerical value, it was dubbed an illegal number. Opponents to the expansion of the scope of copyright criticize the idea of making a particular number illegal.

Commercial HD DVDs and Blu-ray discs integrate copy protection technology specified by the AACS LA. There are several interlocking encryption mechanisms, such that cracking one part of the system does not necessarily crack other parts. Therefore, the "09 F9" key is only one of many parts that are needed to play a disc on an unlicensed player.

AACS can be used to revoke a key of a specific playback device, after it is known to have been compromised, as it has for WinDVD. The compromised players can still be used to view old discs, but not newer releases without encryption keys for the compromised players. If other players are then cracked, further revocation would lead to legitimate users of compromised players being forced to upgrade or replace their player software or firmware in order to view new discs. Each playback device comes with a binary tree of secret device and processing keys. The processing key in this tree, a requirement to play the AACS encrypted discs, is selected based on the device key and the information on the disc to be played. As such, a processing key such as the "09 F9" key is not revoked, but newly produced discs cause the playback devices to select a different valid processing key to decrypt the discs.

== Timeline of AACS cracking ==
=== 2006 ===
On December 26, 2006, a person using the alias muslix64 published a utility named BackupHDDVD and its source code on the DVD decryption forum at the website Doom9. BackupHDDVD can be used to decrypt AACS protected content once one knows the encryption key. muslix64 claimed to have found title and volume keys in main memory while playing HD DVDs using a software player, and that finding them is not difficult.

=== 2007 ===
On January 1, 2007, muslix64 published a new version of the program, with volume key support. On January 12, 2007, other forum members detailed how to find other title and volume keys, stating they had also found the keys of several movies in main memory while running WinDVD.

On or about January 13, a title key was posted on pastebin.com in the form of a riddle, which was solved by entering terms into the Google search engine. By converting these results to hexadecimal, a correct key could be formed. Later that day, the first cracked HD DVD, Serenity, was uploaded on a private torrent tracker. The AACS LA confirmed on January 26 that the title keys on certain HD DVDs had been published without authorization.

Doom9.org forum user arnezami found and published the "09 F9" AACS processing key on February 11:

Nothing was hacked, cracked or even reverse-engineered btw: I only had to watch the "show" in my own memory. No debugger was used, no binaries changed.

— arnezami, February 11, 2007

This key is not specific to any playback device or DVD title. Doom9.org forum user jx6bpm claimed on March 4 to have revealed CyberLink's PowerDVD's key, and that it was the key in use by AnyDVD.

The AACS LA announced on April 16 that it had revoked the decryption keys associated with certain software high-definition DVD players, which will not be able to decrypt AACS encrypted disks mastered after April 23, without an update of the software.

On April 30, 2007, a blogger named "Rudd-O" published the encryption key for HD DVDs and asked readers to share it widely. Knowledge of this numeric key value allowed users to bypass digital rights management (DRM) and copy HD DVDs that previously could not be duplicated. News media reported, and Digg, a news aggregator and social media website, provided a way for users to vote on stories they felt were most newsworthy. Votes by 15,000 Digg users drove an article about the encryption key to the front page of the site.

On May 17, one week before any discs with the updated processing key had reached retail, claims were reported of the new keys having been retrieved from a preview disc of The Matrix Trilogy. On May 23, the key 45 5F E1 04 22 CA 29 C4 93 3F 95 05 2B 79 2A B2 was posted on Edward Felten's Freedom to Tinker Blog by an anonymous commenter and confirmed a week later by arnezami on Doom9 as the new processing key (MKB v3).

== DMCA notices and Digg ==
Screenshot of the Digg front page during the user revolt; almost all of the stories are related to the HD-DVD key.

As early as April 17, 2007, AACS LA had issued DMCA violation notices, sent by Charles S. Sims of Proskauer Rose. Following this, dozens of notices were sent to various websites hosted in the United States. The AACS-LA sent a cease and desist letter to technology news site Digg on May 1, 2007. In its letter, AACS claimed that by publishing news articles on its website that reported on the encryption key, the website was engaging in illegal activity. Articles by numerous journalists reporting on the news story were posted to Digg.

In response to this DMCA demand letter, Jay Adelson, the CEO of Digg, announced that the website would abide by the AACS' requests and self-censor articles reporting on the encryption key. Digg began closing accounts and removing posts containing or alluding to the key. Adelson's decision to self-censor his website caused a backlash from the Digg community, which reacted by creating a flood of posts containing the key, many using creative ways of disguising the key, by semi-directly or indirectly inserting the number, such as in song or images (either representing the digits pictorially or directly representing bytes from the key as colors) or on merchandise. Digg users made sure, by their votes and online participation, that at one point, Digg's "entire homepage was covered with links to the HD-DVD code or anti-Digg references." Eventually, after listening to complaints from Digg's community about Adelson's decision to self-censor news stories about the encryption key, Digg founder Kevin Rose wrote a message to his users stating that the administrators reversed their position. He announced that Digg would stop self-censorship and he acknowledged that he understood the message from Digg's members, stating: "But now, after seeing hundreds of stories and reading thousands of comments, you've made it clear. You'd rather see Digg go down fighting than bow down to a bigger company. We hear you, and effective immediately we won't delete stories or comments containing the code and will deal with whatever the consequences might be."

=== Legal opinions ===
Lawyers and other representatives of the entertainment industry, including Michael Avery, an attorney for Toshiba Corporation, expressed surprise at Digg's decision, but suggested that a suit aimed at Digg might merely spread the information more widely.

If you try to stick up for what you have a legal right to do, and you're somewhat worse off because of it, that's an interesting concept.

— Michael Avery, Toshiba Corp, May 3, 2007

The American Bar Association's eReport published a discussion of the controversy, in which Eric Goldman at Santa Clara University's High Tech Law Institute noted that the illegality of putting the code up is questionable (that Section 230 of the Communications Decency Act may protect the provider when the material itself is not copyrighted), although continuing to allow posting of the key may be "risky", and entertainment lawyer Carole Handler noted that even if the material is illegal, laws such as the DMCA may prove ineffective in a practical sense.

== Impact of the conflict ==
In a response to the events occurring on Digg and the call to "Spread this number", the key was rapidly posted to thousands of pages, blogs and wikis across the Internet. The reaction was an example of the Streisand effect. "In trying to make the cracked issue go away", notes Jeremy Goldman in his 2012 book Going Social, "the AACS's letter (and Digg's response) succeeded only in making the story bigger." Digg founder Kevin Rose observed: "The Digg community is one that loves to have their voice heard, and this has been something that struck a chord with them."

Intellectual property lawyer Douglas J. Sorocco noted, "People are getting creative. It shows the futility of trying to stop this. Once the information is out there, cease-and-desist letters are going to infuriate this community more." Outside the Internet and the mass media, the key has appeared in or on T-shirts, poetry, songs and music videos, illustrations and other graphic artworks, tattoos and body art, and comic strips. The Linux kernel also incorporated a copy of the key for 17.5 years, originally added in 2007 by David Woodhouse as part of the red zone logic and subsequently removed as a routine cleanup in 2024.

On Tuesday afternoon, May 1, 2007, a Google search for the key returned 9,410 results, while the same search the next morning returned nearly 300,000 results. On Friday, the BBC reported that a search on Google shows almost 700,000 pages have published the key, despite the fact that on April 17, the AACS LA sent a DMCA notice to Google, demanding that Google stop returning any results for searches for the key.

Widespread news coverage included speculation on the development of user-driven websites, the legal liability of running a user-driven website, the perception of acceptance of DRM, the failure as a business model of "secrecy based businesses ... in every aspect" in the Internet era, and the harm an industry can cause itself with harshly-perceived legal action.

In an opposing move, Carter Wood of the National Association of Manufacturers said they had removed the "Digg It" link from their weblog:

Until the Digg community shows as much fervor in attacking intellectual piracy as attacking the companies that are legitimately defending their property, well, we do not want to be promoting the site by using the "Digg It" feature.

Media coverage initially avoided quoting the key itself. However, several US-based news sources have run stories containing the key, quoting its use on Digg, though none are known to have received DMCA notices as a result. Later reports have discussed this, quoting the key. Current TV broadcast the key during a Google Current story on the Digg incident on May 3, 2007, displaying it in full on screen for several seconds and placing the story on the station website.

On May 1, 2007, Wikipedia locked out the page named for the number "to prevent the former secret from being posted again". The page on HD DVD was locked as well, to keep out "The Number". This action was later reversed. No one has been arrested or charged for finding or publishing the original key.

=== AACS LA reaction ===
On May 7, 2007, the AACS LA announced on its website that it had "requested the removal solely of illegal circumvention tools, including encryption keys, from a number of web sites", and that it had "not requested the removal or deletion of any ... discussion or commentary". The statement continued, "AACS LA is encouraged by the cooperation it has received thus far from the numerous web sites that have chosen to address their legal obligations in a responsible manner." BBC News had earlier quoted an AACS executive saying that bloggers "crossed the line", that AACS was looking at "legal and technical tools" to confront those who published the key, and that the events involving Digg were an "interesting new twist".

== Free Speech Flag ==
The Free Speech Flag, a symbol of personal liberty used to promote freedom of speech, was created on May 1, 2007. Designed by artist John Marcotte, the flag and its colors correspond to the AACS encryption key.

=== Design and message ===
John Marcotte, a writer and editor at the website Badmouth, created the Free Speech Flag with the intent of disseminating the secret HD DVD code on the Internet, publishing it on the website on May 1, 2007. In his initial post announcing his flag, Marcotte criticized how the mere use of numbers had become intellectual property.

"We want to start a movement", Marcotte wrote. "A movement to reclaim personal liberties and decorporatize the laws of our nation." He encouraged online viewers of his work to spread his message throughout the Internet and to freely publicize his work. "To that end we have made a flag, a symbol to show support for personal freedoms. Spread it as far and wide as you can."

Marcotte embedded the secret HD DVD key into the colors of the flag itself, using the flag hex code format colors #09F911 #029D74 #E35BD8 #4156C5 #635688. By appending the byte "C0" to the bottom right corner of the flag, Marcotte implied that the act of publishing a number is "Crime Zero". He originally released the flag "freely" with "rights for people to make similar, derivative works", but later released it into the public domain.

=== Impact of the flag ===
PlayStation 3 Free Speech Flag, created in honor of the original Free Speech Flag

Soon after it was first published, bloggers publicized the Free Speech Flag, increasing its popularity and disseminating the code within the flag. The flag entered popular culture as Internet users chose creative ways to spread knowledge of the HD DVD encryption key.

Users wore the code emblazoned on T-shirts, added it to poems, integrated the code into the lyrics of hip hop songs, and created music utilizing its numeric values. Musician Keith Burgun composed a song using the code titled "Oh Nine, Eff Nine", and published it on YouTube. The sole lyrics to the song were the numbers of the digital code itself: "09 F9 11 02 9D 74 E3 5B D8 41 56 C5 63 56 88 C0". "I thought it was a source of comedy that they were trying so futilely to quell the spread of this number," Burgun said. "The ironic thing is, because they tried to quiet it down it’s the most famous number on the Internet."

Matthew Rimmer, senior lecturer at Australian National University, commented upon the legality of the innovative ways Internet users like Marcotte chose to publicize the secret HD DVD code: "I don't think it's necessarily designed to stay within the bounds of the law. It's just a fun way to comment on what's happened. I think that it's designed to show that the law is absurd or ridiculous and should be abolished."

Antonio Ceraso of Pennsylvania State University placed the flag's conception within a larger framework—"the formation of a communal ethos...the 09 F9 tribe"—and posed the question: "Would five striped colors arranged into a flag constitute an anti-circumvention device under the DMCA?"

The flag inspired Jeff Thompson, assistant professor and program director of Visual Art and Technology at the Stevens Institute of Technology, to create a sound file of the AACS encryption key as a melody. After a similar encryption key was cracked for the PlayStation 3 gaming system, a new flag was created by a different user as a tribute to Marcotte's original flag.

== See also ==
- Code as speech
- DeCSS
- DVD Copy Control Association
- FCKGW (Microsoft Windows)
- Freedom of information
- HDCP master key release
- Illegal number
- Internet censorship
- PlayStation 3 homebrew § Private key compromised
- Security through obscurity
- Streisand effect
- Texas Instruments signing key controversy
- Criticism of copyright
