= Ultra HD Blu-ray =

Optical disc storage medium

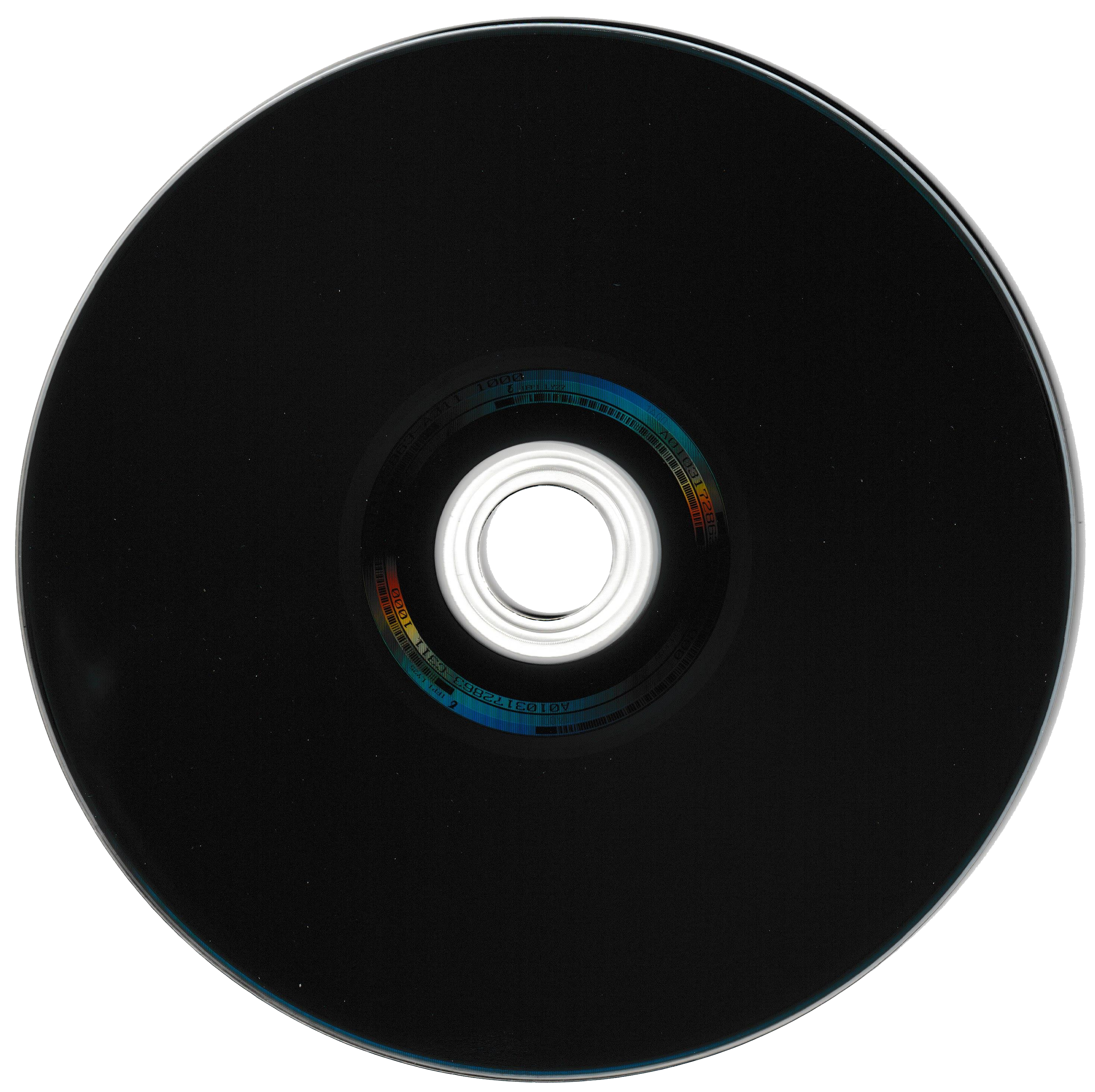
- Reverse side of a 100 GB Ultra HD Blu-ray disc
- Media type: High-density optical disc
- Encoding: H.265/MPEG-H Part 2 (HEVC)
- Capacity: 50 GB (dual-layer, 92 Mb/s); 66 GB (dual-layer, 123, 144 Mb/s); 100 GB (triple-layer, 123, 144 Mb/s)
- Block size: 2 KB sector, 64 KB block size
- Read mechanism: 405 nm laser
- Developed by: Blu-ray Disc Association
- Dimensions: 120 mm (4.7 in) diameter
- Weight: 20 grams (0.71 oz)
- Usage: Ultra-high-definition video PlayStation 5 format software
- Extended from: Standard Blu-ray
- Released: February 14, 2016 (10 years ago)

Ultra HD Blu-ray (4K Ultra HD, UHD-BD, or 4K Blu-ray) is a digital optical disc data storage format that is an enhanced variant of Blu-ray. Ultra HD Blu-ray supports 4K UHD (3840 × 2160 pixel resolution) high dynamic range (HDR) video at frame rates up to 60 progressive frames per second, encoded using High Efficiency Video Coding. These discs are incompatible with existing standard Blu-ray players.

The first Ultra HD Blu-ray Discs were officially released in the United States on February 14, 2016. To differentiate retail Ultra HD Blu-ray releases, the format usually uses a black opaque or largely transparent keep case packaging format (as opposed to blue), but with the same case size as standard Blu-ray. The format is supported on Microsoft's Xbox One X, One S (except All-Digital Edition), Series X, and Sony's PlayStation 5 (except Digital Edition). Software made for the PlayStation 5 can use 100 GB UHD Blu-ray discs. Official support on PC was limited to certain Intel processors and only on Microsoft Windows; Intel began phasing out the necessary features on CPUs from Alder Lake onwards due to multiple security vulnerabilities like Spectre, and removed the features entirely in April 2025.

== History ==
On May 12, 2015, the Blu-ray Disc Association (BDA) revealed completed specifications and the official Ultra HD Blu-ray logo. Ultra HD Blu-ray technology was licensed in mid-2015, and players had an expected release date of Christmas 2015. On February 14, 2016, the BDA released Ultra HD Blu-ray with mandatory support for HDR10 Media Profile video and optional support for Dolby Vision.

In December 2017, the BDA completed the specification for an 8K Blu-ray format for use in Japan. However a spokesperson from the 8K association said that the release of such a format would be unlikely. This may be partly driven due to lower than expected sales of 8K resolution televisions.

On January 23, 2018, the BDA spec v3.2 gained optional support for HDR10+ and for SL-HDR2 (developed by Philips and Technicolor) also known as Advanced HDR by Technicolor. However, no Ultra HD Blu-ray player has ever supported SL-HDR2, and no discs encoded in SL-HDR2 have been released.

== Specifications ==
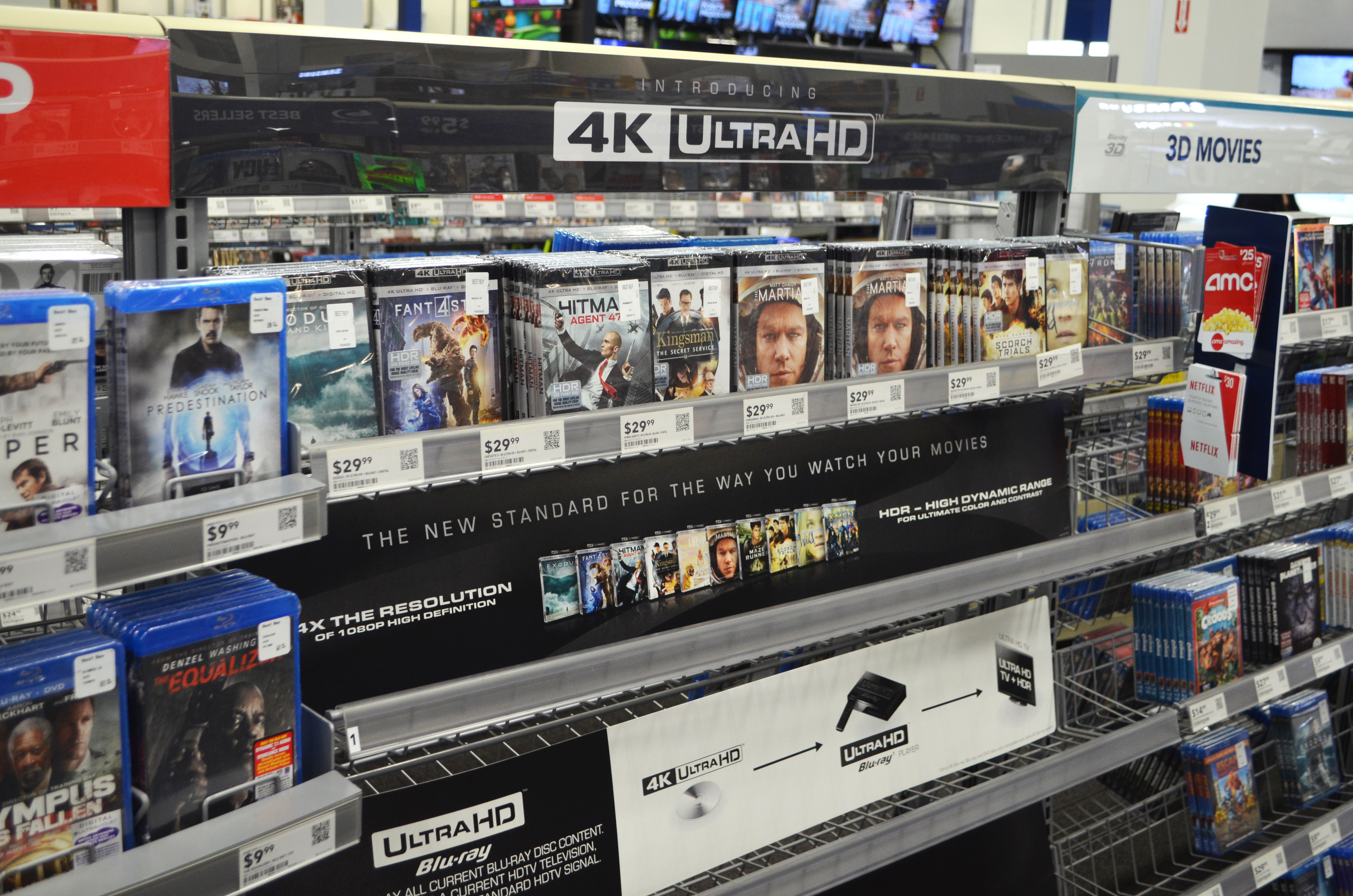
Early 4K Blu-ray movies

Ultra HD Blu-ray discs support both high dynamic range by increasing the color depth to 10-bit per color and a greater color gamut than supported by conventional Blu-ray video by using the Rec. 2020 color space. Ultra HD Blu-ray discs also support a 12-bit per color container via Dolby Vision. Moreover, Dolby Vision makes use of dynamic metadata, which adjusts the brightness and tone mapping per scene. In contrast, standard HDR10 only makes use of static metadata, which sets the same brightness and tone mapping for the entirety of the content.

The specification for 4K Blu-ray allows for three disc capacities, each with its own data rate: 50 GB at 72 or 92 Mbit/s, and 66 GB and 100 GB at 92, 123, or 144 Mbit/s. On 66 GB and 100 GB discs, the pits and lands are not narrower than those of a standard Blu-ray Disc, but shorter, which increases the capacity of each layer from 25 GB to 33 1/3 GB (this structure is similar to the one used by BDXL discs). This also means that each revolution of such a disc transfers more data than that of a standard Blu-ray Disc, which means the transfer rate is higher with the same linear velocity. In addition, the disc can be encoded to have the drive hold the full 5,000 rpm until it reaches a point largely away from the innermost part of the disc if an even higher transfer rate is needed. 50 and 66 GB use two layers, and 100 GB uses three layers.

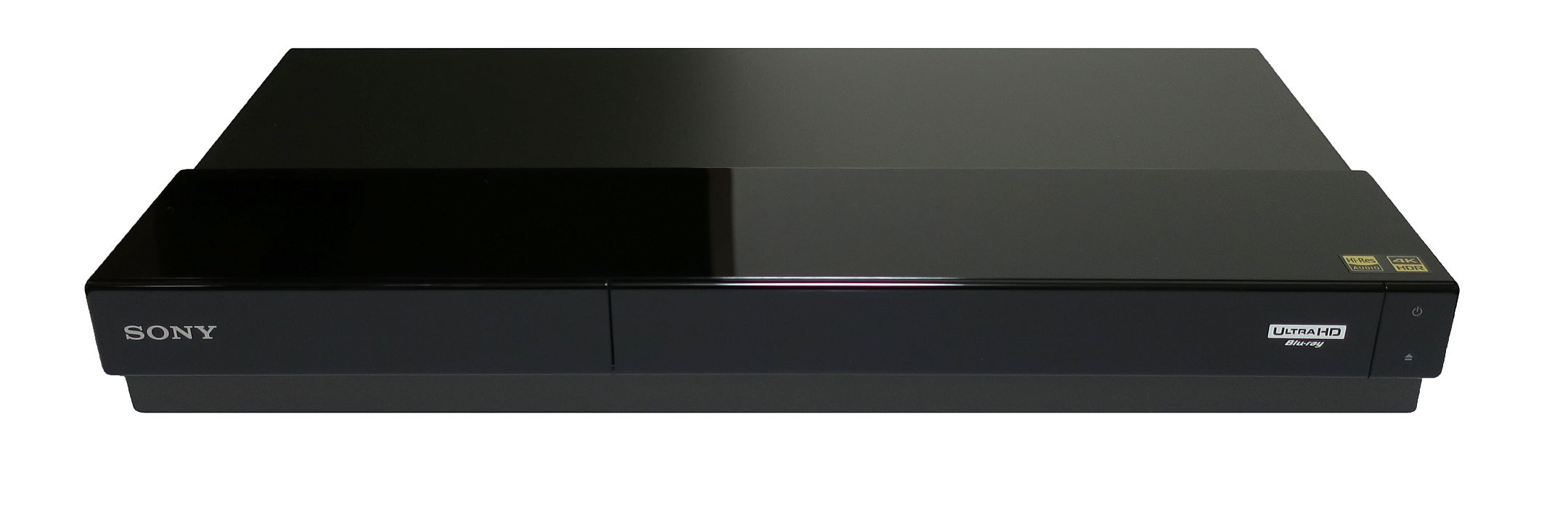
Sony Ultra HD Blu-ray disc player

A Playstation 5 Ultra HD Blu-ray Disc

Unlike conventional DVDs and Blu-rays, the 4K format does not officially have region coding, although some releases have been reported to conditionally prevent playback based on player region. Ultra HD Blu-ray uses a new revision of AACS DRM: AACS 2. AACS 2.1 is used on certain releases such as Stand by Me, Fury, The Patriot, and Zombieland.

Most retail Ultra HD Blu-ray discs are encoded with Ateme TITAN. Ultra HD Blu-ray discs use HDMV or BD-J for menus. Subtitles use Presentation Graphic Stream, which is the same format as normal Blu-ray discs.

=== 8K format ===
Even though a specification was defined for 8K, no commercial products using it have been released. The executive director of the 8K Association said 8K discs being developed had "a low probability."

=== Advanced HDR by Technicolor ===
The term Advanced HDR, as used by Technicolor, covers a group of three Technicolor HDR technologies: SL-HDR1 (Single-Layer HDR1); SL-HDR2; SL-HDR3.

According to Technicolor, it is "a single-layer solution, known as Technicolor HDR (ETSI standard SL-HDR1), which ensures backwards compatibility with all non-HDR screens and non-HDR equipment. Broadcasters just need to produce a single feed, and the technology allows content to be converted into a format for both legacy screens and HDR screens."

== PC playback ==
The only official support for Ultra HD Blu-ray playback was by using a Windows computer with activated Intel Software Guard Extensions (SGX), which made PCs with AMD processors, as well as macOS and Linux devices, officially incompatible. Intel introduced SGX in the Skylake generation Core processors in 2016, enabling PCs to play protected Blu-ray discs.

In January 2022, in part as a result of transient execution CPU vulnerabilities like Spectre, Intel deprecated support for SGX for the Rocket Lake and Alder Lake generation desktop processors, leading to Ultra HD Blu-ray discs being unplayable on those systems, even with licensed software such as PowerDVD.

Following that, Intel stopped supporting the SGX feature on all new CPU models, and, in April 2025, Intel shut down the Intel SGX verification server and revoked all old CPU models that still supported the Intel SGX feature. Ultra HD Blu-ray disc playback feasibility officially ceased on all Windows PC platforms accordingly without using DRM cracking (disc ripping) methods.

On all systems that have a Blu-ray drive with patched firmware (LibreDrive), including those without Intel SGX support, Ultra HD Blu-ray discs can be played on VLC media player either by using MakeMKV to decrypt the disc or by providing VLC media player with the necessary plugins and decryption keys. Alternatively Ultra HD Blu-ray discs can also be ripped with software such as MakeMKV, DVDFab, or AnyDVD HD.
