= Cryptomeria (disambiguation) =

Cryptomeria may refer to:

- Cryptomeria, a monotypic genus of conifer in the cypress family
- Cryptomeria (moth), a genus of moth
- Cryptomeria cipher, a cryptographic cipher
