= Audio watermark =

Electronic identifier embedded in an audio signal

An audio watermark is a unique electronic identifier embedded in an audio signal, typically used to identify ownership of copyright. It is similar to a watermark on a photograph.

Digital watermarking is the process of embedding information into a signal (e.g. audio, video or pictures) in a way that is difficult to remove. If the signal is copied, then the information is also carried in the copy. Watermarking has become increasingly important to enable copyright protection and ownership verification.

== Producer tags and fingerprinting ==
An audible producer tag identifies a producer to listeners, while a hidden audio watermark carries information intended to be recovered by a detector. Audible tags can be used on public beat previews, while hidden watermarks can be retained in delivered recordings. Tracing a delivered copy requires a record linking its watermark identifier to the recipient.

Acoustic fingerprinting compares recordings with reference audio without adding an identifier to the audio signal.

== Spread spectrum ==
One technique for audio watermarking is spread spectrum audio watermarking (SSW). In SSW, a narrow-band signal is transmitted over a much larger bandwidth such that the signal energy presented in any signal frequency is undetectable. Thus the watermark is spread over many frequency bands so that the energy in one band is undetectable. An interesting feature of this watermarking technique is that destroying it requires noise of high amplitude to be added to all frequency bands.

Spreading spectrum is done by a pseudonoise (PN) sequence. In conventional SSW approaches, the receiver must know the PN sequence used at the transmitter as well as the location of the watermark in the watermarked signal for detecting hidden information.

Although PN sequence detection is possible by using heuristic approaches such as evolutionary algorithms, the high computational cost of this task can make it impractical. Much of the computational complexity involved in the use of evolutionary algorithms as an optimization tool is due to the fitness function evaluation that may either be very difficult to define or be computationally very expensive.

One of the recent proposed approaches—in fast recovering the PN sequence—is the use of fitness granulation as a promising "fitness approximation" scheme. With the use of the fitness granulation approach called "Adaptive Fuzzy Fitness Granulation (AFFG)", the expensive fitness evaluation step is replaced by an approximate model. When evolutionary algorithms are used as a means to extract the hidden information, the process is called Evolutionary Hidden Information Detection, whether fitness approximation approaches are used as a tool to accelerate the process or not.

== Copy protection ==
Audio watermarking can be used as part of a copy protection system to prevent duplication of digital media. A watermark can be embedded in digital media, such as films or music albums, to block playback of unauthorized copies on devices that look for the watermark.

DVD-Audio discs can use an audio watermark in concert with Content Protection for Prerecorded Media (CPPM) to prevent duplication. DVD-Audio players contain a unique key to decrypt a media key block present on the disc. If a DVD-Audio player encounters the audio watermark on a disc without a media key block, it will halt playback.

Cinavia is a similar audio watermarking technology which can be applied to film soundtracks. Many DVD & Blu-ray players (including the PlayStation 3) and some software (such as PowerDVD) check for the watermark. If the Cinavia watermark is detected on an audio stream and the necessary authorization is not present (such as a CSS or AACS key on an optical disc), playback will stop or audio will be muted, depending on the scenario.

== Traitor tracing ==
Digital cinema projection systems which play back encrypted Digital Cinema Package (DCP) files employ a media block, which generates and inserts an audio watermark ("Audio Forensic Mark") into the film soundtrack in real-time. The watermark contains a time stamp and unique ID associated with the specific projector playing the film. Watermarking does not stop unauthorized recordings or their distribution, though it may deter unauthorized copying by those aware of the watermarking process. Watermarks are designed to be detectable in any copies, including unauthorized recordings (such as cams). Information obtained from watermarks in unauthorized copies, along with logs generated by media blocks, can be examined as part of an investigation to identify the source of the recordings, called traitor tracing.

== See also ==
- Acoustic fingerprint
- Activated Content
