= Secure Digital Music Initiative =

Technology for playing music forum

Secure Digital Music Initiative (SDMI) was a forum formed in late 1998 ostensibly with the purpose of developing technology and rights management systems specifications that will protect once developed and installed, the playing, storing, distributing and performing of digital music.

It was composed of more than 200 IT, consumer electronics, security technology, ISP and recording industry companies, as well as authors, composers and publishing rightsholders (represented by CISAC and BIEM representatives, mainly from SGAE/SDAE (Gonzalo Mora Velarde and José Manuel Macarro), GEMA (Alexander Wolf und Thomas Kummer-Hardt), SACEM/SDRM (Aline Jelen, Catherine Champarnaud, Laurent Lemasson), MCPS/PRS (Mark Isherwood), ASCAP, BMI (Edward Oshanani), and SODRAC),

Specifically, the goals of the SDMI were to provide consumers with convenient access to music online and in new digital distribution systems, to apply digital rights management restrictions to the work of artists, and to promote the development of new music-related business and technologies. SDMI was a direct response to the widespread success of the MP3 file format.

According to their web site, SDMI existed to develop “technology specifications that protect the playing, storing, and distributing of digital music such that a new market for digital music may emerge.” It would have been used by DataPlay, an optical disc format that, at the time, was cheaper and had higher capacity than memory cards, and by SD cards.

== Method ==
The strategy for the SDMI group involved two stages. The first was to implement a secure digital watermarking scheme. This would allow music to be tagged with a secure watermark that was hard to remove from the source audio without damaging it. The second was to ensure that SDMI-compliant players would not play SDMI tagged music that was not authorized for that device. The reasoning was that even if the files were distributed they could not be played as the device would detect the music was not authorized to be played on it.

== Challenges ==
A key part of the strategy included demonstrating that the watermarking could not be detected by third parties and as a result be removed from the music. As part of the process of ratifying the technology the SDMI announced a challenge with their Open Letter to the Digital Community on September 6, 2000. The letter invited hackers, cryptologists and others to detect and remove the watermark from some example pieces of music. Several groups became involved, including a group led by Ed Felten. Felten's group claimed to have cracked the scheme and successfully removed the watermark according to the automated judging software supplied by the SDMI. The SDMI disagreed, noting that there was a requirement that the files lose no sound quality and the automated system did not take this into account.

When Felten attempted to publish an academic paper describing the analysis of the SDMI scheme (having opted out of the confidentiality requirement that would have allowed him to claim $10,000 in prize money) the SDMI, RIAA and Verance Corporation threatened legal action under the auspices of the DMCA. The controversy about stifling of academic research resonated through scientific and cryptography circles until his paper was eventually published in 2001 after assurances from the United States Department of Justice that the DMCA would not be used to stifle legitimate research.

== Demise ==
On October 15, 1999, Eric Scheirer, later a digital music analyst for Forrester Research, wrote an editorial for MP3.com titled "The End of SDMI" which declared that the group's true goal to fold the technology industry into an alliance that would guarantee the record industry's near monopoly over musical content had failed. It drew a rebuttal from the president of the SDMI, Dr. Leonardo Chiariglione. The SDMI has been inactive since May 18, 2001.

Chiariglione stepped down as SDMI's director in 2001, and later explained the reason for SDMI's halt after his departure as follows:

Unfortunately it turned out that none of the technologies submitted could satisfy the requirements set out at the beginning, e.g. of being unnoticeable by so-called "golden ears". SDMI has then decided to suspend its work and wait for progress in technology.

— Leonardo Chiariglione, "Opening content protection" (2003), Riding the Media Bits

== See also ==
- Analog hole
- Content Protection for Recordable Media
- Cinavia
- DataPlay
