= Cryptomeria cipher =

Block cipher used by the 4C Entity

- The Feistel function of the Cryptomeria cipher.

General
- Designers: 4C Entity
- First published: 2003
- Derived from: DES
- Related to: CSS

Cipher detail
- Key sizes: 56 bits
- Block sizes: 64 bits
- Structure: Feistel network
- Rounds: 10

Best public cryptanalysis
- A boomerang attack breaks all 10 rounds in 2^{48} time with known S-box, or 2^{53.5} with an unknown S-box, using 2^{44} adaptively chosen plaintexts/ciphertexts.

The Cryptomeria cipher, also called C2, is a proprietary block cipher defined and licensed by the 4C Entity. It is the successor to CSS algorithm (used for DVD-Video) and was designed for the CPRM/CPPM digital rights management scheme which are used by DRM-restricted Secure Digital cards and DVD-Audio discs.

== Cipher details ==
The C2 symmetric key algorithm is a 10-round Feistel cipher. Like DES, it has a key size of 56 bits and a block size of 64 bits. The encryption and decryption algorithms are available for peer review, but implementations require the so-called "secret constant", the values of the substitution box (S-box), which are only available under a license from the 4C Entity.

The 4C Entity licenses a different set of S-boxes for each application (such as DVD-Audio, DVD-Video and CPRM).

== Cryptanalysis ==
In 2008, an attack was published against a reduced 8-round version of Cryptomeria to discover the S-box in a chosen-key scenario. In a practical experiment, the attack succeeded in recovering parts of the S-box in 15 hours of CPU time, using 2 plaintext-ciphertext pairs.

A paper by Julia Borghoff, Lars Knudsen, Gregor Leander and Krystian Matusiewicz in 2009 breaks the full-round cipher in three different scenarios; it presents a 2^{24} time complexity attack to recover the S-box in a chosen-key scenario, a 2^{48} boomerang attack to recover the key with a known S-box using 2^{44} adaptively chosen plaintexts/ciphertexts, and a 2^{53.5} attack when both the key and S-box are unknown.

== Distributed brute force cracking effort ==
Following an announcement by Japanese HDTV broadcasters that they would start broadcasting programs with the copy-once broadcast flag starting with 2004-04-05, a distributed Cryptomeria cipher brute force cracking effort was launched on 2003-12-21. To enforce the broadcast flag, digital video recorders employ CPRM-compatible storage devices, which the project aimed to circumvent. However, the project was ended and declared a failure on 2004-03-08 after searching the entire 56-bit keyspace, failing to turn up a valid key for unknown reasons. Because the attack was based on S-box values from DVD-Audio, it was suggested that CPRM may use different S-boxes.

Another brute force attack to recover DVD-Audio CPPM device keys was mounted on 2009-05-06. The attack was intended to find any of 24570 secret device keys by testing MKB file from Queen "The Game" DVD-Audio disc. On 2009-10-20 such key for column 0 and row 24408 was discovered.

The similar brute force attack to recover DVD-VR CPRM device keys was mounted on 2009-10-20. The attack was intended to find any of 3066 secret device keys by testing MKB from Panasonic LM-AF120LE DVD-RAM disc. On 2009-11-27 such key for column 0 and row 2630 was discovered.

By now the CPPM/CPRM protection scheme is deemed unreliable.
