= CPPM =

CPPM may refer to:

- Carlos Pedro Pablo Miguel - the first names of the Eden Field Alpacas
- Centre de Physique des Particules de Marseille - a research laboratory in Southern France
- Certified Physician Practice Manager through AAPC
- Certified Practising Project Manager
- Certified Professional Purchasing Manager through American Purchasing Society
- Chaotic pulse position modulation (CPPM)
- Content Protection for Pre-recorded Media see Content Protection for Recordable Media
- Content Protection for Playback Media
