= RedFox =

Belizean software development company

- Formerly: Slysoft
- Founded: 2003; 23 years ago
- Defunct: June 5, 2024
- Website: https://www.redfox.bz/

RedFox (formerly SlySoft) was a software development company based in Belize. The company was most prominently known for its software AnyDVD, which can be used to bypass copy protection measures on optical media, including DVD and Blu-ray Disc media, as well as CloneCD, which were used to back up the contents of optical discs.

The company formerly operated as the St. John's, Antigua and Barbuda-based SlySoft. At some point in February 2016, SlySoft closed down, with its home page replaced by a message citing "recent regulatory requirements". On or around 16 February 2016, AACS LA had requested that the Office of the United States Trade Representative place Antigua and Barbuda on its Priority Watch List of countries that fail to prevent intellectual property violations, with specific reference to SlySoft. However, the company's online forum remained online, and had replaced the brand SlySoft with "RedFox". SlySoft developers also revealed that none of the company's staff was actually based in Antigua, that the company was not involved in legal settlements from AACS LA, and that key staff members still had access to SlySoft's technical infrastructure—including build systems and licensing servers—feasibly allowing development of AnyDVD to continue.

On 2 March 2016, SlySoft reformed as RedFox, under a top-level domain based in Belize, and released a new version of AnyDVD.

Since 5 June 2024, the company's website and its software are unavailable again.

== Products ==
- AnyDVD/AnyDVD HD – DVD ripper and device driver providing on-the-fly decryption of DVD, HD DVD, and Blu-ray discs and removal of copy protection and digital rights management (DRM). Protections are removed transparently in the background, allowing direct access for media players or other software to read, play, or copy protected discs.
- AnyStream – to download and remove DRM from streaming video on Amazon Prime Video, Disney+, HBO Max, Hulu (USA), Paramount+, Peacock and Netflix
- CloneCD – to copy optical discs in raw format
- CloneDVD Mobile – to convert DVD files to mobile video players like the iPod or the PlayStation Portable
- Game Jackal – to create CD profiles so a disc isn't required when starting the game. The extended version Game Jackal Enterprise has additional features, such as automatic distribution of game profiles to client machines

== AACS and BD+ ==
SlySoft was the first, in February 2007, to offer AACS circumvention that worked for any disc available; previous programs only cracked "compatible" discs using a database of known keys.

On 8 November 2007, SlySoft claimed to have completely cracked BD+. However, this turned out to be incorrect, as subsequent versions of BD+ security code have caused SlySoft to re-design its software. On 3 March 2008, SlySoft updated AnyDVD HD allowing the full decryption of BD+, allowing for not only the viewing of the film itself but also playing and copying disks with third-party software. A third iteration of BD+ was released in November 2008, and was announced to be cracked by SlySoft with the release of AnyDVD HD 6.5.0.2 on 29 December 2008. A fourth version of BD+ security code was discovered with the movie Australia on 17 February 2009, thwarting the effectiveness of SlySoft's software.

However, on 19 March 2009, SlySoft updated AnyDVD HD to version 6.5.3.1 which allowed the decryption of the new version of BD+ used by Australia.

== Licensing ==
On 1 December 2008, SlySoft announced it would for the first time begin charging its customers for updates to its software.

In November 2010, SlySoft initially announced via email and on their forum the discontinuation of the lifetime licensing option, beginning January 2011, encouraging customers to purchase the lifetime option "while it is still possible."

In January 2011, announcements regarding the change were deleted, and a new structured licensing plan was put into place; including the lifetime licensing option for a steeper price. The software can still be used after the support date, but won't be able to be updated.

In 2016, following the collapse of Slysoft, customers were required to purchase a new license to use RedFox software.
