= Activated Content =

- Website type: Digital Audio Watermarking
- Owner: Private
- Creator: Activated Content
- Registration: Client
- Launched: January 5, 2000

Activated Content is a digital watermarking company based in Seattle, Washington. The company has its own proprietary audio watermarking technology and provides solutions based around watermarking.

The system was designed with help from Sony Music and Universal Music.
