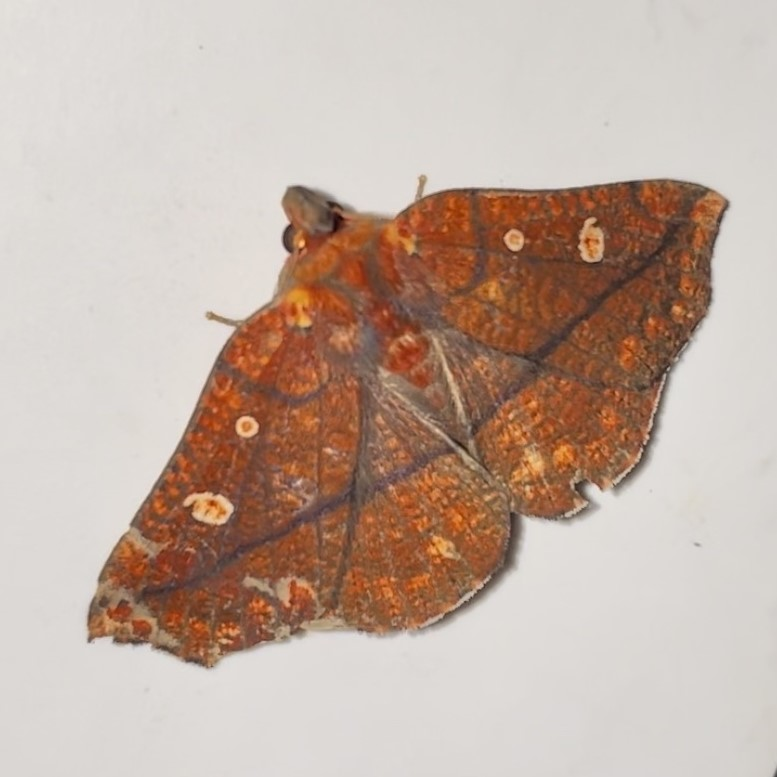

Scientific classification
- Kingdom: Animalia
- Phylum: Arthropoda
- Clade: Pancrustacea
- Class: Insecta
- Order: Lepidoptera
- Superfamily: Noctuoidea
- Family: Erebidae
- Genus: Cryptomeria; Saalmüller, 1880
- Species: C. mabillei

Binomial name
- Cryptomeria mabillei Saalmüller, 1880

= Cryptomeria mabillei =

Species of moth

Cryptomeria mabillei is species of moth in the family Erebidae. It is the only species in the monotypic genus Cryptomeria.

== Distribution ==
It is found on Madagascar. Both the genus and the species were first described by Saalmüller in 1880.
