= Edward Felten =

American computer scientist (born 1963)

Edward William Felten
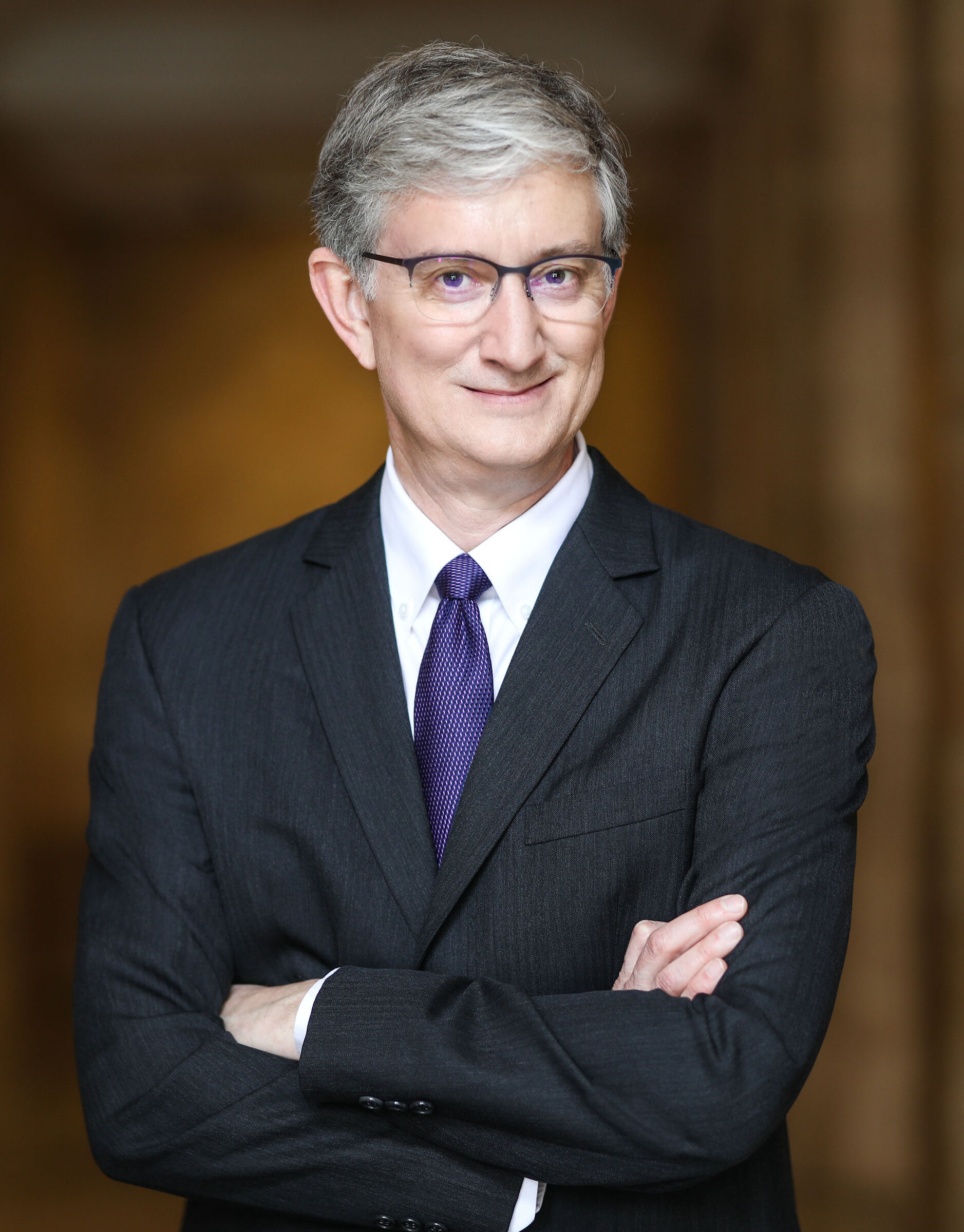
- Official portrait with the Privacy and Civil Liberties Oversight Board in 2019
- Born: March 25, 1963 (age 63)
- Citizenship: American
- Education: California Institute of Technology (BS); University of Washington (MS, PhD)
- Known for: Secure Digital Music Initiative
- Awards: EFF Pioneer Award
- Scientific career
- Fields: Computer science; Public affairs
- Workplaces: Princeton University; Federal Trade Commission
- Thesis: Protocol compilation: High-performance communication for parallel programs (1993)
- Doctoral advisor: Edward D. Lazowska; John Zahorjan
- Doctoral students: J. Alex Halderman

Edward William Felten (born March 25, 1963) is an American computer scientist. At Princeton University, he served as the Robert E. Kahn Professor of Computer Science and Public Affairs, as well as being director of the Center for Information Technology Policy from 2007 to 2015 and from 2017 to 2019. In the Obama administration, he served as chief technologist of the Federal Trade Commission from 2011 to 2012 and as deputy chief technology officer of the United States from 2015 to 2017. Felten retired from Princeton University in July 2021. He then officially transitioned to Emeritus status. He also currently serves as Co-founder and Chief Scientist at Offchain Labs.

Felten has done a variety of computer security research, including work on proof-carrying authentication and work on security related to the Java programming language, but he is perhaps best known for his paper on the Secure Digital Music Initiative (SDMI) challenge.

In 2018, Felten started to serve as board member of the Privacy and Civil Liberties Oversight Board, a term that ended on January 29, 2025.

== Biography ==
Felten attended the California Institute of Technology and graduated with a Bachelor of Science in physics in 1985. He worked as a staff programmer at Caltech from 1986 to 1989 on a parallel supercomputer project at Caltech. He then enrolled as a graduate student in computer science at the University of Washington. He was awarded a Master of Science in 1991 and a Ph.D. in 1993. His Ph.D. thesis was on developing an automated protocol for communication between parallel processors.

In 1993, he joined the faculty of Princeton University in the department of computer science as an assistant professor. He was promoted to associate professor in 1999 and to professor in 2003. In 2006, he joined the Woodrow Wilson School of Public and International Affairs, but computer science remains his home department. In 2005, he became the director of the Center for Information and Technology Policy at Princeton. He has served as a consultant to law firms, corporations, private foundations, and government agencies. His research involves computer security, and technology policy.

He lives in Princeton, New Jersey with his family. From 2006 to 2010, he was a member of the board of the Electronic Frontier Foundation (EFF). In 2007, he was inducted as a Fellow of the Association for Computing Machinery.

In November 2010, he was named Chief Technologist of the Federal Trade Commission.

In 2013, Felten was elected a member of the National Academy of Engineering for contributions to security of computer systems, and for impact on public policy.

On May 11, 2015, he was named Deputy U.S. Chief Technology Officer for The White House.

== United States v. Microsoft ==
Felten was a witness for the United States government in United States v. Microsoft, where the software company was charged with committing a variety of antitrust crimes. During the trial, Microsoft's attorneys denied that it was possible to remove the Internet Explorer web browser from a Windows 98 equipped computer without significantly impairing the operation of Windows.

Citing research he had undertaken with Christian Hicks and Peter Creath, two of his former students, Felten testified that it was possible to remove Internet Explorer functionality from Windows without causing any problems with the operating system. He demonstrated his team's tool in court, showing 19 ways in which it is normally possible to access the web browser from the Windows platform that his team's tool rendered inaccessible.

Microsoft argued that Felten's changes did not truly remove Internet Explorer but only made its functionality inaccessible to the end user by removing icons, shortcuts and the iexplore.exe executable file, and making changes to the system registry. This led to a debate as to what exactly constitutes the "web browser," since much of the core functionality of Internet Explorer is stored in a shared dynamic-link library, accessible to any program running under Windows.

Microsoft also argued that Felten's tool did not even completely remove web-browsing capability from the system since it was still possible to access the web through other Windows executables besides iexplore.exe, such as the Windows help system.

== The SDMI challenge ==
As part of a contest in 2000, SDMI (Secure Digital Music Initiative) invited researchers and others to try to break the digital audio watermark technologies that they had devised. In a series of individual challenges, the participants were given a sample audio piece, with one of the watermarks embedded. If the participants sent back the sample with the watermark removed (and with less than an acceptable amount of signal loss, though this condition was not stated by SDMI), they would win that particular challenge.

Felten was an initial participant of the contest. He chose to opt out of confidentiality agreements that would have made his team eligible for the cash prize. Despite being given very little or no information about the watermarking technologies other than the audio samples and having only three weeks to work with them, Felten and his team managed to modify the files sufficiently that SDMI's automated judging system declared the watermark removed.

SDMI did not accept that Felten had successfully broken the watermark according to the rules of the contest, noting that there was a requirement for files to lose no sound quality. SDMI claimed that the automated judging result was inconclusive, as a submission which simply wiped all the sounds off the file would have successfully removed the watermark but would not meet the quality requirement.

=== SDMI lawsuits ===
Felten's team developed a scientific paper explaining the methods used by his team in defeating the SDMI watermarks. Planning to present the paper at the Fourth International Information Hiding Workshop of 2001 in Pittsburgh, Felten was threatened with legal action by SDMI, the Recording Industry Association of America (RIAA), and Verance Corporation, under the terms of the DMCA, on the argument that one of the technologies his team had broken was currently in use in the market. Felten withdrew the presentation from the workshop, reading a brief statement about the threats instead. SDMI and other copyright holders denied that they had ever threatened to sue Felten. However, SDMI appears to have threatened legal action when spokesman Matt Oppenheim warned Felten in a letter that "any disclosure of information gained from participating in the Public Challenge....could subject you and your research team to actions under the Digital Millennium Copyright Act.". This has been described as a case of censorship by copyright.

Felten, with help from the Electronic Frontier Foundation, sued the groups, requesting a declaratory judgement ruling that their publication of the paper would be legal. The case was dismissed for a lack of standing.

Felten presented his paper at the USENIX security conference in 2001. The United States Department of Justice has offered Felten and other researchers assurances that the DMCA does not threaten their work and stated that the legal threats against them were invalid.

== Sony rootkit investigation ==
The 2005 Sony BMG CD copy protection scandal started when security researcher Mark Russinovich revealed on October 31, 2005, that Sony's Extended Copy Protection ("XCP") copy protection software on the CD Get Right with the Man by Van Zant contained hidden files that could damage the operating system, install spyware and make the user's computer vulnerable to attack when the CD was played on a Microsoft Windows-based PC. Sony then released a software patch to remove XCP.

On November 15, 2005, Felten and J. Alex Halderman showed that Sony's method for removing XCP copy protection software from the computer makes it more vulnerable to attack, as it essentially installed a rootkit, in the form of an Active X control used by the uninstaller, and left it on the user's machine and set so as to allow any web page visited by the user to execute arbitrary code. Felten and Halderman described the problem in a blog post:

The consequences of the flaw are severe, it allows any Web page you visit to download, install, and run any code it likes on your computer. Any Web page can seize control of your computer; then it can do anything it likes. That's about as serious as a security flaw can get.

== Diebold voting machine analysis ==
On September 13, 2006, Felten and graduate students Ariel Feldman and Alex Halderman discovered severe security flaws in a Diebold Election Systems (now Premier Election Solutions) voting machine. Their findings claimed, "Malicious software running on a single voting machine can steal votes with little if any risk of detection. The malicious software can modify all of the records, audit logs, and counters kept by the voting machine, so that even careful forensic examination of these records will find nothing amiss."

== Sequoia voting machine analysis ==
In early 2008, New Jersey election officials announced that they planned to send one or more Sequoia Advantage voting machines to Ed Felten and Andrew Appel (also of Princeton University) for analysis. In March 2008, Sequoia sent an e-mail to Professor Felten asserting that allowing him to examine Sequoia voting machines would violate the license agreement between Sequoia and the county which bought them, and also that Sequoia would take legal action "to stop [...] any non-compliant analysis, [...] publication of Sequoia software, its behavior, reports regarding same or any other infringement of our intellectual property." This action sparked outrage among computer technology activists.

After examining Sequoia's machines, Felten and Appel indeed discovered grave problems with the accuracy of the machines. They also demonstrated that the machines can be hacked and compromised within minutes.

Shortly after that, Sequoia's corporate Web site was hacked. The hack was first discovered by Ed Felten. Sequoia took its Web site down on 20 March and removed the "intrusive content."

== Cold boot attack ==
In February 2008, Felten and his students were part of the team that discovered the cold boot attack, which allows someone with physical access to a computer to bypass operating system protections and extract the contents of its memory.

== Federal Trade Commission ==
In November 2010, Felten was named the first Chief Technologist of the Federal Trade Commission, for which he took a one-year leave of absence from Princeton University.

== Awards ==
- Member of the American Academy of Arts and Sciences, elected 2011
- Member of the National Academy of Engineering, elected 2013
