= Key2Audio =

key2audio is a copy restriction system for Audio CDs, developed by Sony DADC. The system gained notoriety after it was discovered that one can effectively disable the system by tracing the outer edge of a CD with a felt-tip marker.

The system works by applying a bogus data track onto the disc during glass master manufacturing. Since computers are designed to read data before music, this prevents playback on a PC and thereby prevents ripping as well as ordinary listening using a computer. CD players ignore any non-audio tracks on a disc, and can therefore play the CD unimpeded - Enhanced CDs also take advantage of this factor.

Currently there are two major versions of the key2Audio protection: the original key2Audio, and key2AudioXS.

== key2Audio ==
key2audio products are highly compatible because the audio session is not modified. Since additional data sessions are used, the CD is not Red Book compliant and should not use the "Compact Disc" logo. As with any passive DRM technology some players are unable to play the non-standard disc.

Since optical computer CD/DVD drives are also capable of reading Red Book audio CDs, a lot of player manufacturers use these same CD/DVD ROM drives instead of specialized Audio CD / Video DVD only drives in order to reduce costs.

DVD players and car stereo systems seem to have most problems with incompatibilities of key2Audio protected CDs.

A protected CD still achieves a maximum recording time of 77 minutes and supports full ISRC, UPC and CD-Text capabilities.

Early versions of this copy protection were infamous for being easily circumvented with a marker pen, by drawing a circle on the rim of the visible edge of audio data.

=== Technical background ===
It appears that key2Audio protected disc TOC contains three sessions written on the disc. Two of them contain small data tracks, and one contains the audio tracks. The regular CD players pick the audio tracks outright, while the computer CD and DVD players get confused by the corrupted TOC information. CD players and drives that do not support multisession discs are immune to this confusion.

It can be worked around by e.g. CloneCD or Exact Audio Copy.

== key2AudioXS ==
key2audioXS combines a PC playback and a clone-proof Multimedia session for CD-Extra and Web Links.

The new version of this protection allows the listener the right to play the CD on a PC, and allows controlled burning the audio to CD. This solution allows consumers a limited amount of private copies. The record labels can individually define the burn count. These copies are then also fully protected and offer the same efficiency and compatibility as the original disc.

The audio sessions are being encoded to Windows Media Audio DRM-protected files, so that some portable devices are supported and online distribution prevented.

Furthermore, with key2audioXS the user can now pick and send audio tracks via email. With a usability period defined by the record label, users can share music, facilitating promotion activities for labels. Additionally, some discs feature "n-CD", which lets the user access bonus features such as videos, ringtones, lotteries and the like. The original n-CD is a unique key reserved for just their owners.

For this purpose, the user interface for key2Audio on PC allows for navigation and includes a copying and burning tool, as well as additional content such as bonus pictures and lyrics.

The audio part can hold up to 75 minutes.
