= Doom9 =

English language technology website

- Available in: English
- Owner: Doom9
- Website: forum.doom9.org
- Commercial: No
- Launched: March 2000; 26 years ago
- Current status: Online

Doom9 is a website featuring information on digital audio and video manipulation (mostly video) and digital copyrights. It is also the forum username of the author of the page, an Austrian who was a college student at the time of the creation of the site. Doom9 is also known as the primary discussion forum for several major video encoding tools, including x264, AviSynth, and MeGUI.

== History ==
Started in March 2000, the site has expanded to contain a wide range of information on the subject of digital video encoding and DVD backup (or ripping). The most popular sections of the site were the guides to DVD ripping and the annual codec comparisons, where popular digital video codecs were compared on the basis of quality, speed, and compression. The forum is frequented by many developers of the tools and codecs featured on the site, such as FairUse4WM.

The VirtualDubMod project began after many modifications to VirtualDub were posted on the Doom9 forums.

Doom9 gained notoriety due to its involvement in the AACS encryption key controversy. The utility BackupHDDVD was first posted by a Doom9 poster using the alias muslix64. The earliest information on how to find title and volume keys was also first revealed on Doom9 forums, by other users. The key that set off the controversy was also first posted by a user using the name arnezami.

== Projects ==
Due to the concentration of forum members with technical backgrounds, various software projects have been developed and maintained by forum members. These include:

- Media Player Classic Home Cinema, a lightweight media player using the DirectShow API
- ffdshow-tryouts, a collection of free software codecs, most notably libavcodec, provided as DirectShow filters

Doom9 members have also contributed significantly to various software projects, including:

- x264, a free software H.264 video encoder

== See also ==
- libdvdcss
