= Media Key Block =

Optical disc copyright protection system

The Media Key Block (MKB) is one of the keys included inside the optical discs implementing AACS DRM system. The MKB is used to prevent unauthorized and revoked devices from playing Blu-ray and HD DVD discs content. The MKB is defined by AACS consortium, which is the consortium by companies from the film industry and the electronics industry including IBM, Intel, Microsoft, Matsushita (Panasonic), Sony, Toshiba, The Walt Disney Company and Warner Bros.

The MKB key is found in the physical support (the disc) together with the content of the disc encrypted. The MKB has the function of validating the reproduction devices on which the disc is being played and obtained, from the devices codes, the key that will allow the decryption of the disc content. That is the Media Key ($K_m$). Since August 2022, version 78 has been the most recent MKB version.

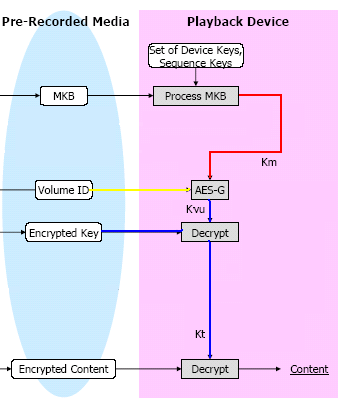
AACS decryption process

== How it works ==
Blu-Ray and HD-DVD discs contain the following data: the encrypted content (usually video), the Volume ID (VID), the Encrypted Title Key(s), and the MKB. The Volume ID is stored in the BD-ROM Mark (on Blu-ray disc) or burst cutting area (on HD DVD and Blu-ray discs), a special area of the disc unable to be copied by consumer optical disc drives. The MKB is also found encrypted in the disc to prevent it from being extracted off the disc and being manipulated and/or reproduced by another non-authorized device.

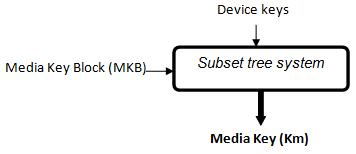
Process to obtain the Media key, using the MKB and the Device Keys as the inputs

The reproduction device contains its own keys, unique for each model, called Device Keys. These keys are conceded by the AACS LA. In the moment of the reproduction, one of these keys will decrypt the MKB contained on the disc, and as a result of this process, the Media Key is obtained.

The Media Key is combined with the VID (Volume ID) and as a result the Volume Unique Key ($K_{vu}$) is obtained. With the $K_{vu}$, the Encrypted Title Key is able to be decrypted and the Title Key is retrieved, which allows the decryption of the content of the disc.

This way the system can prevent contents from being viewed on devices that have not been authorized. Therefore, the system allows updating the MKB in future releases of the content in order to revoke compromised devices.

== Key structure ==
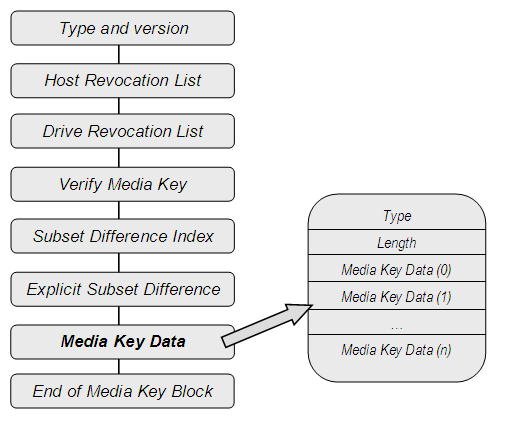
Media Key Block structure

Even though it seems a simple mechanism, the MKB key, which is found in the physical support of the disc, follows a complex structure. The MKB is distributed in blocks that contain the version of the Media key, the list of devices that have been revoked, a field to authenticate the MKB, and other fields that specify parameters corresponding to the decryption algorithm and define the structure of the own Media Key and also the Media key itself.

The MKB itself is found inside the field Media Key Data Record and has a variable length but it is always a multiple of 4 bytes.

== Advantages and disadvantages ==
Many consumer associations have complained about this system, as it can lead to a situation where some physical devices will not decode any content even though they do not infringe any intellectual property, which means consumers that use those devices will not be able to view contents encrypted with the MKB.

This situation has become even worse with the publication on multiple web sites of the Media Key, which is the key that allows decryption of Volume ID, and at the same time, the encrypted content, without the need of using a playback device authorized by the AACS or a valid MKB to view the content, can be viewed on the unauthorized device.
