= Content Protection for Recordable Media =

Content Protection for Recordable Media and Pre-Recorded Media (CPRM / CPPM) is a mechanism for restricting the copying, moving, and deletion of digital media on a host device, such as a personal computer, or other player. It is a form of digital rights management (DRM) developed by The 4C Entity, LLC (consisting of IBM, Intel, Matsushita, and Toshiba).

The CPRM / CPPM specification defines a renewable cryptographic method for restricting content when recorded on physical media. The currently implemented method utilizes the Cryptomeria cipher (C2) algorithm for symmetric encryption. The types of physical media supported include, but are not limited to, recordable DVD media and flash memory. The most widespread use of CPRM is arguably in Secure Digital cards such as the SD-Audio standard. Note that the available 0.9 revision includes only the portions of the specification covering DVD media. CPPM is used in DVD-Audio.

The CPRM / CPPM specification was designed to meet the requirements of intellectual property owners while balancing the implementation requirements of manufacturers. To accomplish these requirements, the system defined by the specification relies on public-key cryptography's key management for interchangeable media, content encryption, and "media-based renewability."

The use of the CPRM specification and access to the cryptographic materials required to implement it requires a license from 4C Entity, LLC. The license includes a facsimile key for the product which uses CPRM / CPPM technology.

A controversial proposal to add generic key exchange commands (that could be utilized by CPRM and other content restriction technologies) to ATA specifications for removable hard drives was abandoned after outcry in 2001. CPRM is widely deployed in the popular Secure Digital card consumer-electronics flash memory format.

== 4C Entity ==
The 4C Entity is a digital rights management (DRM) consortium formed by IBM, Intel, Panasonic and Toshiba that has established and licensed the CPRM / CPPM specification. 4C Entity was founded in 1999 when Warner Music approached the companies to develop stronger DRM technologies for the then-novel DVD-Audio format after Intel’s Content Scramble System (CSS) technology was hacked.

== See also ==
- Burst cutting area
- DVD-Audio § Copy protection
