= AnyDVD =

DVD ripping software

- Developer: RedFox
- Release: 3 July 2003; 22 years ago
- Stable release: 8.7.1.1 (13 July 2024; 23 months ago) [±]
- Operating system: Windows 2000 or later
- Type: DVD ripper
- License: Shareware
- Website: redfox.bz (no longer operates)

AnyDVD is a device driver for Microsoft Windows which enables on-the-fly decryption of DVD, HD DVD, and Blu-ray discs as well as removal or circumvention of several types of copy protection and digital rights management (DRM). Protections are removed transparently in the background, allowing direct disc access for media players or other software to read, play, or copy discs.

Protections removed by AnyDVD include Content Scramble System (CSS), Advanced Access Content System (AACS), BD+, DVD region codes, Analog Protection System, User Operation Prohibitions (UOPs), RipGuard, and ARccOS. AnyDVD can also fix mastering errors to ensure strict compliance with disc standards, improving compatibility with third-party tools, particularly DVD Shrink and Nero Recode. AnyDVD is also able to remove copy protection from audio CDs, such as Key2Audio.

AnyDVD includes a DVD ripper to create disc images from discs without needing to use third-party software. The ripper module is based on code from Elby's CloneDVD software. Old versions used a ripper based on FixVTS, but FixVTS was shut down by legal threats from Sony in June 2007.

== AnyDVD HD ==
Originally, AnyDVD just supported DVDs. On February 17, 2007, SlySoft released AnyDVD HD, a software upgrade adding functionality for Blu-ray and HD DVD discs. AnyDVD HD includes support for AACS-encrypted discs and region-coded Blu-ray discs (HD DVD discs do not have region codes).

On March 19, 2008, SlySoft released version 6.4.0.0 of AnyDVD HD, which removes BD+ as well. Version 6.4.6.2, released 22 August 2008, introduced the ability to rip movies to an ISO format.

== Rebranding ==
Following the resurrection of AnyDVD under the Redfox branding, AnyDVD was released in a new version (V8.0.1.0) on 17 May 2016. License keys from SlySoft for previous versions (V7.6.9.5 and earlier) are unsupported in new versions, including keys sold as "Free updates until: Forever". New license keys must be purchased from Redfox for the new version (available for 1, 2, and 3 years of support and updates or for 'lifetime'). The ability of previous versions (V7.6.9.1 to V7.6.9.5 inc.) to access to the new Redfox Online Protection Database will be blocked from 31 May 2016.

== CDs ==
AnyDVD can also work in the background to automatically detect and remove additional data sessions contained on Audio CDs which contain copy protection measures. This allows audio tracks to be directly accessed on the system for direct playback and for access by CD ripping software. Intentional tracking errors in the audio may also be discovered, for example, those errors involved with key2AudioXS, which may cause major skipping distortions in the ripped audio tracks. By bypassing these methods AnyDVD can provide clean, distortion-free playback and ripping.

== System requirements ==
The requirements remained unchanged on the developer's website since 2016, except that Windows 11 was added in 2023:

- A Windows compatible PC with minimum 2 GHz Processor and 1 GB RAM
- Windows XP 32/64bit, Windows Vista 32/64bit, Windows 7 32/64bit, Windows 8 32/64bit, Windows 10 32/64bit, Windows 11
- For HD decryption and ripping, the minimum OS is Windows XP SP3.
- For Blu-ray or HD DVD media, a Blu-ray or HD DVD compliant drive is required.

== Legal issues ==
Advertising, sale, and lending of AnyDVD is outlawed in Germany (but possession is not), as it removes copy prevention from DVDs. The Heise news portal was sued by the record industry for linking to SlySoft's website in a news report. The publisher subsequently counter sued with claims of violation of their constitutionally guaranteed freedom of the press and had, as of April 2007, lost two appeal proceedings. The German Federal Constitutional Court decided not to rule on Heise's appeal for the time being because remedies in the ordinary courts had not been exhausted. In October 2010, the Federal Court of Justice of Germany decided in favor of Heise, a verdict now legally binding. The legal status of AnyDVD in other countries is unclear.

Giancarlo Bettini, the owner of Slysoft, was convicted of 6 counts in an Antigua court under the copyright act of 2003 and ordered to pay $30,000 in restitution. In February 2016, SlySoft shut down, with its home page replaced by a message citing "recent regulatory requirements". However, the company's support forum remained online, with the name SlySoft replaced with "RedFox". SlySoft developers also revealed that none of the company's staff were actually based in Antigua, where SlySoft claimed to have been based, that the company was not involved in legal settlements from AACS LA, and that key staff members still had access to SlySoft's technical infrastructure—including build systems and licensing servers—feasibly allowing development of AnyDVD to continue. This was followed by the release of version 7.6.9.1, which was the first released under the Belize/Latvia-based banner of RedFox.

== Disappearance ==
In July 2024, RedFox's website disappeared, with both servers shut down and DNS records removed.

As AnyDVD does not require online activation, existing users can still install and use it to decrypt DVDs. An offline version of the Blu-ray key database has been available for download on RedFox's website (while it was still online), and users who have installed it are still able to use AnyDVD HD to decrypt Blu-ray movies released up to that point.

== See also ==
- CloneCD
- DVD ripper
- DeCSS
- Libdvdcss
