= AACS LA =

AACS LA (Advanced Access Content System Licensing Administrator) is the body that develops and licenses the AACS copy-protection system used on the HD DVD and Blu-ray Disc high-definition optical disc formats.

== History ==
The AACS LA consortium was founded in 2004 consisting of 8 companies which are Intel, Microsoft, Panasonic, IBM, Sony, Toshiba, Warner Bros. Pictures and The Walt Disney Company. The AACS standard was delayed 2 times, the first of which were caused by development issues, then the second from an important member of the Blu-ray group expressing concerns. At the request of Toshiba, an interim standard was published which did not include some features, like managed copy. On July 5, 2009 the license of AACS1 went online.

== See also ==
- AACS encryption key controversy
- Advanced Access Content System
