= PowerDVD =

Media player software for Microsoft Windows

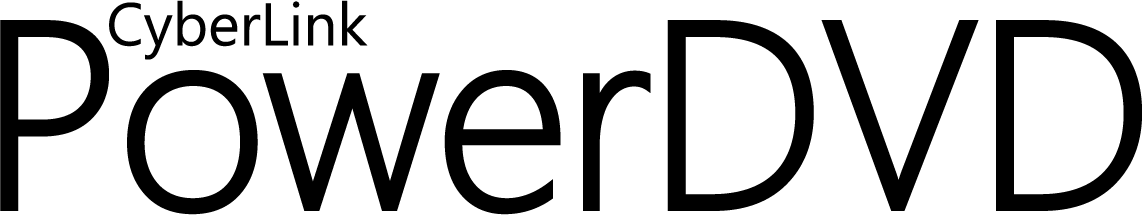

- Screenshot of PowerDVD 22
- Developer: CyberLink
- Release: 1996; 30 years ago
- Stable release: PowerDVD 24 (2025-07-08) [±]
- Preview release: none [±]
- Operating system: Windows 11; Windows 10; Windows 8/8.1; Windows 7
- Available in: 11 languages
- List of languages English, French, German, Italian, Peninsular Spanish, simplified Chinese, traditional Chinese, Japanese, Korean, Russian, Brazilian Portuguese
- Type: Media player
- License: Proprietary commercial software
- Website: www.cyberlink.com/products/powerdvd

PowerDVD is a media player software for Microsoft Windows created by CyberLink, for DVD movie discs, Blu-ray movie discs, and digital video files, photos and music.

PowerDVD is offered in various versions, which vary greatly in terms of functionality, and can be expanded to include additional functions such as playback of licensed audio formats or power-saving functions for use on notebooks using plug-ins and so-called “enhancement packs”.

During 2016, PowerDVD achieved certification from the Blu-ray Disc Association (BDA) for the playback of Ultra HD Blu-ray Discs, and became the world's first software player to pass the BD-ROM 4.0 PC Application Software License process. Playback of UHD Blu-ray discs requires an SGX-capable Intel CPU; with SGX support removed in newer generations of Intel CPUs, playback of UHD Blu-rays is no longer possible on newer PCs.

== Features ==
- 8K video playback: added in PowerDVD 19
- Ultra HD Blu-ray disc playback: PowerDVD 17 is the first software that supports 4K UHD Blu-ray drives; however, this feature only worked on PCs with Intel's Software Guard Extensions (SGX). In January 2022, Intel deprecated support for SGX for the Rocket Lake and Alder Lake generation desktop processors, leading to Ultra HD Blu-ray discs being unplayable on those systems. Cyberlink permanently removed Ultra HD Blu-ray disc playback with PowerDVD 22 version 3526.
- 360-Degree VR: PowerDVD 17 supports 360-degree camera such as Samsung Gear 360 and the Nikon KeyMission. Available to watch VR content on an Oculus Rift or HTC Vive headset.
- Blu-ray 3D disc playback: added in PowerDVD 10 and removed in PowerDVD 20.
- Blu-ray disc playback: added in PowerDVD 6.
- TrueTheater: PowerDVD adds TrueTheater image/color correction and enhancement, also motion enhancement to make motion smoother. TrueTheater HDR enhancement provides a larger color space.
- Media Casting to Streaming Devices: supported devices as Roku, Chromecast, and Apple TV.

== See also ==
- Comparison of video player software
