= List of Blu-ray player manufacturers =

This aims to be a complete list of Blu-ray manufacturers. This list is not necessarily complete or up to date - if you see a manufacturer that should be here but is not (or one that should not be here but is), please update the page accordingly.

== A ==
- American Recordable Media
- Ayankaran International
- Acu-disc

== C ==
- Cambridge Audio
- CMC Magnetics

== D ==
- Denon

== F ==
- Fukuda

== I ==
- Imation
- Insignia

== J ==
- JVC

== L ==
- LaCie
- LG

== M ==
- Maxell
- Microsoft
- Moser Baer

== O ==
- OPPO Digital

== P ==
- Panasonic
- Philips
- Pioneer Corporation

== R ==
- Ritek
- River Pro Audio

== S ==
- Sony
- Samsung
- Sharp

== V ==
- Verbatim Corporation

== Y ==
- Yamaha Corporation

== See also ==
- Blu-ray Disc authoring
- Blu-ray Disc
- Blu-ray Disc Association
- Blu-ray Disc recordable
- Blu-ray Region Code
- CBHD Based on HD DVD format.
- Comparison of high definition optical disc formats
- Digital rights management
- HD DVD
- HD NVD
- High definition optical disc format war
- Optical disc
- PlayStation 3
- PlayStation 4
- Xbox One
