= List of optical disc manufacturers =

This aims to be a complete list of optical disc manufacturers, including pre-recorded/pressed/replicated, record-able/write-once and re-writable discs. This list is not necessarily complete or up to date - if you see a manufacturer that should be here but is not (or one that should not be here but is), please update the page accordingly. This list only lists manufacturers - not brands. For example, many Maxell DVDs are made by Ritek or CMC magnetics. Many companies use equipment from Singulus Technologies. This list includes both CD, DVD and Blu-ray recordable and rewritable media manufacturers (like Ritek), and disc replicators (companies that replicate discs with pre-recorded content, like Sony DADC).

== A ==
- Anwell Technologies (Defunct in 2019)

== B ==
- BeAll

== C ==
- CDA, Inc
- CD Video Manufacturing, Inc.
- Cinram (went bankrupt due to shrinking demand, purchased by Technicolor SA)
- CMC Magnetics

== D ==
- Discmakers
- Daxon Technology
- Disc Tarra
- Discovery Systems (Defunct)
- Dyntara (Defunct)

== E ==
- EMI (sold to Cinram)

== F ==
- Fujifilm
- FAS Development Corp. (stopped in 2017)

== G ==
- Gigastorage Corporation

== H ==
- Hitachi Maxell (Maxell, stopped)

== I ==
- Imation (stopped)
- Infodisc (stopped)

== L ==
- Lead Data Inc.

== M ==
- Memory-Tech
- Micro-works Technology (defunct)
- Mitsui Chemicals (MAM-A)
- Moser Baer (Defunct since 2018 due to bankruptcy; Its assets have been liquidated)
- Mitsubishi Kagaku Media/Mitsubishi Chemical Corporation / Verbatim (sold in 2019 to CMC Magnetics)

== O ==
- Optodisc Ltd.

== P ==
- PSI Media and Fulfillment Services
- Pandisk Technologies
- Philips
- Plasmon Data Systems (Defunct in late 1990's)
- PrimeDisc
- Princo Corp (seems to have stopped, as of 2020 they no longer appear on their home page)
- Panasonic (Matsushita) (made DVD-RAM, stopped due to shrinking demand; made Blu-ray discs for recording until Feb 2023)

== R ==
- Ricoh
- Ritek

== S ==
- SKC
- Sky Media Manufacturing SA
- Sonopress
- Sony (withdrew making recordable discs in 2024)
- Sony DADC
- Summit Creations Pte. Ltd.

== T ==
- JVC / Taiyo Yuden (stopped due to shrinking demand, assets sold to CMC magnetics)
- TDK Corporation (former)
- Technicolor SA
- Toshiba-EMI (sold to EMI Music Japan in 2006)
- Traxdata

== U ==
- Umedisc Group

== V ==
- Verbatim
- Vivastar (defunct)

== W ==
- WEA Manufacturing (sold to Cinram)

== See also ==
- Blu-ray Disc authoring
- Blu-ray Disc
- Blu-ray Disc Association
- Blu-ray Disc recordable
- Blu-ray Region Code
- CBHD Based on HD DVD format.
- Comparison of high definition optical disc formats
- Digital rights management
- HD DVD
- HD NVD
- High definition optical disc format war
- Optical disc
- PlayStation 3
