= Blu-ray Disc Association =

Industry development and licensing consortium

- Trade name: BDA
- Type: Incentive
- Industry: Consortium
- Founded: 20 May 2002; 24 years ago
- Headquarters: Los Angeles, California, U.S.
- Area served: Worldwide
- Members: List: Dolby Laboratories; DTS; Hitachi-LG Data Storage; Intel; LG Electronics; Lionsgate; Mitsubishi Electric; Metro-Goldwyn-Mayer Pictures; Oracle; Panasonic; Philips; Pioneer; Samsung Electronics; Sharp; Sony; Technicolor; Toshiba; Universal Pictures; Walt Disney Studios; Warner Bros.; Xperi
- Website: blu-raydisc.info

Blu-ray Disc Association (BDA) is the industry consortium that develops and licenses Blu-ray technology and is responsible for establishing format standards and promoting business opportunities for Blu-ray Disc. The BDA is divided into three levels of membership: the board of directors, contributors, and general members.

The "Blu-ray Disc founder group" was started on 20 May 2002 by nine electronic companies: Panasonic, Pioneer, Philips, Thomson, LG Electronics, Hitachi, Sharp, Samsung Electronics and Sony. In order to enable more companies to participate, it announced in May 2004 that it would form the Blu-ray Disc Association, which was inaugurated on 4 October 2004.

== Members ==
=== Board ===
The board members as of November 2016 are:

- Sony
- Xperi
- DTS
- Hitachi-LG Data Storage
- Intel Corporation
- Koninklijke Philips
- LG Electronics
- Lionsgate
- Mitsubishi Electric
- Metro-Goldwyn-Mayer Storage Status
- Oracle Corporation
- Panasonic
- Pioneer Corporation
- Samsung Electronics
- Sharp Corporation
- Dolby Laboratories
- Technicolor SA
- Toshiba
- Universal Studios
- The Walt Disney Company
- Warner Bros. Entertainment

=== Contributors ===
The contributors as of December 2017 are:

- BluFocus Inc.
- CESI Technology Co. Ltd.
- China Hualu group Co., Ltd.
- Corel Corporation
- CyberLink
- Deluxe Digital Studios, Inc.
- Fraunhofer IIS
- Irdeto USA, Inc
- JVC KENWOOD Corporation
- Memory-Tech Holdings Inc
- Scenarist Inc
- Testronic Laboratories, Inc.
- sMedio, Inc.
- Funai Electric Co., Ltd.
- Lionsgate Entertainment
- Lite-On IT Corporation
- MediaTek Inc
- Nvidia Corporation
- Ritek

== Timeline of major changes to membership ==
- On 3 October 2004 20th Century Fox announced that it was joining the BDA, and on 29 July 2005 the studio officially announced its support for Blu-ray Disc.
- On 10 March 2005 Apple Computer (now Apple) announced its support for Blu-ray Disc and joined the BDA.
- On 31 August 2006 Sun Microsystems joined the BDA.
- On 30 August 2007, during the IFA Consumer Electronics Fair 2007, Acer and China Hualu joined BDA, and a few days later Acer also announced that they joined HD DVD North American Promotion Group.

== Timeline of major events and announcements involving members ==
- On 30 June 2004, Panasonic, a founder member of the Blu-ray Disc Association, became the second manufacturer after Sony to launch a Blu-ray Disc consumer product into the Japanese market. The DMR-E700BD recorder supported writing to existing DVD formats, and became the first unit to read and write to dual-layer Blu-ray Discs with a maximum capacity of 50 gigabytes. The launch price of the recorder was US$2780.
- On 8 December 2004, The Walt Disney Company (and its home video division, Walt Disney Studios Home Entertainment) announced its exclusive support for Blu-ray Disc.
- On 7 January 2005, Vivendi Games and Electronic Arts announced their support for the Blu-ray Disc format.
- On 28 July 2005, Verbatim Corporation, part of Mitsubishi Chemical Media, announced its support for Blu-ray Disc and HD DVD storage format development.
- On 17 August 2005, Lions Gate Home Entertainment announced it would release its content using the Blu-ray Disc format.
- On 7 September 2005, Samsung confirmed their next generation of optical drives will support Blu-ray Disc and HD DVD discs.
- On 2 October 2005, Both Paramount and The Weinstein Company announced they would endorse Blu-ray Disc, while still supplying content on the rival HD DVD — in order to give consumers a choice.
- On 20 October 2005, Warner Bros. announced they would release titles on the Blu-ray Disc format, in addition to HD DVD Video.
- On 1 November 2005, 20th Century Fox announced it would release its content using the Blu-ray Disc format.
- On 9 November 2005, Metro-Goldwyn-Mayer announced it would support Blu-ray Disc, and plans to have titles available when Blu-ray Disc is launched.
- On 19 November 2005, Sony Pictures Home Entertainment announced that they finished editing the first Blu-ray Disc, a full-length movie, Charlie's Angels: Full Throttle. The disc uses MPEG-2 compression at a resolution of 1920×1080 (it was not announced whether it will be 1080p or 1080i) and claims to use a menu interface that would succeed current DVD-Video interfaces.
- On 4 January 2006, at the Consumer Electronics Show Samsung and Philips announced their first Blu-ray Disc players for the U.S. market. Samsung announced the BD-P1000, retailing for US$1000 and sporting HDMI output with backward support for DVD formats (DVD-RAM, DVD-RW, DVD-R, DVD+RW, and DVD+R), while Philips announced the BDP-9000. Philips also announced their all-in-one PC TripleWriter Blu-ray Disc drive and range of Blu-ray Disc media would arrive in 2nd quarter of 2006.
- On 7 March 2006, Sony announced it would be shipping rewritable single-layer 25 GB 2x speed Blu-ray Discs to Europe, with dual-layer discs arriving later in the year.
- On 16 March 2006, Sony announced a Blu-ray Disc player, the first VAIO desktop PC with a Blu-ray Disc recorder, and a Blu-ray Disc internal PC drive would be released in the summer of 2006. The VAIO PC would be shipped with a free 25 GB Blank BD-RE (rewritable) Blu-ray Disc worth $25 USD.
- On 10 April 2006, TDK announced in a press release that it began shipping 25 GB BD-R and BD-RE media (at prices of $19.99 USD and US$24.99 respectively). TDK also announced that it would be releasing 50 GB BD-R and BD-RE media later this year (at prices of US$47.99 and $59.99 respectively).
- On 16 May 2006, Sony announced its first VAIO notebook computer that will include a built-in Blu-ray Disc recorder with a 17" WUXGA display capable of displaying 1080p (at a price of US$3499.99). The VAIO shipped in June including software to play Blu-ray Disc movies and an HDMI-A input for other HD devices, and that the PlayStation 3 home video game console would be using the Blu-ray Disc format. The console's predecessor, PlayStation 2, uses DVDs for video game software.
- On 17 May 2006, Pioneer shipped BDR-101A, a PC-based Blu-ray Disc recorder drive.
- On 15 June 2006, Samsung announced the industry's first BD-P1000 player had begun shipping to U.S. retail stores for availability on June 25, 2006.
- On 18 July 2006, Verbatim Corporation announced that it was shipping its ScratchGuard coated BD-R and BD-RE Blu-ray Disc recordable and rewritable discs to stores in Europe, with discs priced between £20 and £24 (GBP).
- On 16 August 2006, Sony announced shipment of 50 GB dual-layer Blu-ray Disc recordable discs with a suggested retail price of $48.
- On 4 January 2008, Warner Bros. announces that it would abandon HD-DVD support by the end of May.
- On 5 January 2008, New Line Cinema announced it would be following Warner's lead, backing Blu-ray exclusively.
- On 11 February 2008, Netflix announced to phase out HD DVDs and begin to carry only Blu-ray Discs.
- On 19 February 2008, Universal Studios announced it would be releasing movies on Blu-ray Disc format making it the last Hollywood major motion picture studio to release titles on the Blu-ray Disc format.
- On 20 February 2008, The Weinstein Company announced it would be releasing movies on Blu-ray Disc format.
- On 21 February 2008, Paramount Pictures announced it would be releasing movies on Blu-ray Disc format.
- On 21 February 2008, DreamWorks SKG announced it would be following Paramount and Amblin's lead, it would abandon HD-DVD support by the end of March.
- On 15 August 2008, Microsoft added Blu-ray native support to their operating systems Windows XP, Windows Vista, Windows Server 2003 and Windows Server 2008.
- On 21 May 2013, Microsoft announced that the Xbox One home video game console would be using the Blu-ray Disc format. The console's predecessor, Xbox 360, used DVDs for video game software and supported an optional external HD DVD drive for films (which was discontinued in February 2008).
