= List of Blu-ray manufacturers =

List of Blu-ray manufacturers may refer to:

- List of Blu-ray player manufacturers
- List of Blu-ray disc manufacturers
