= Blu-ray =

Digital optical disc format

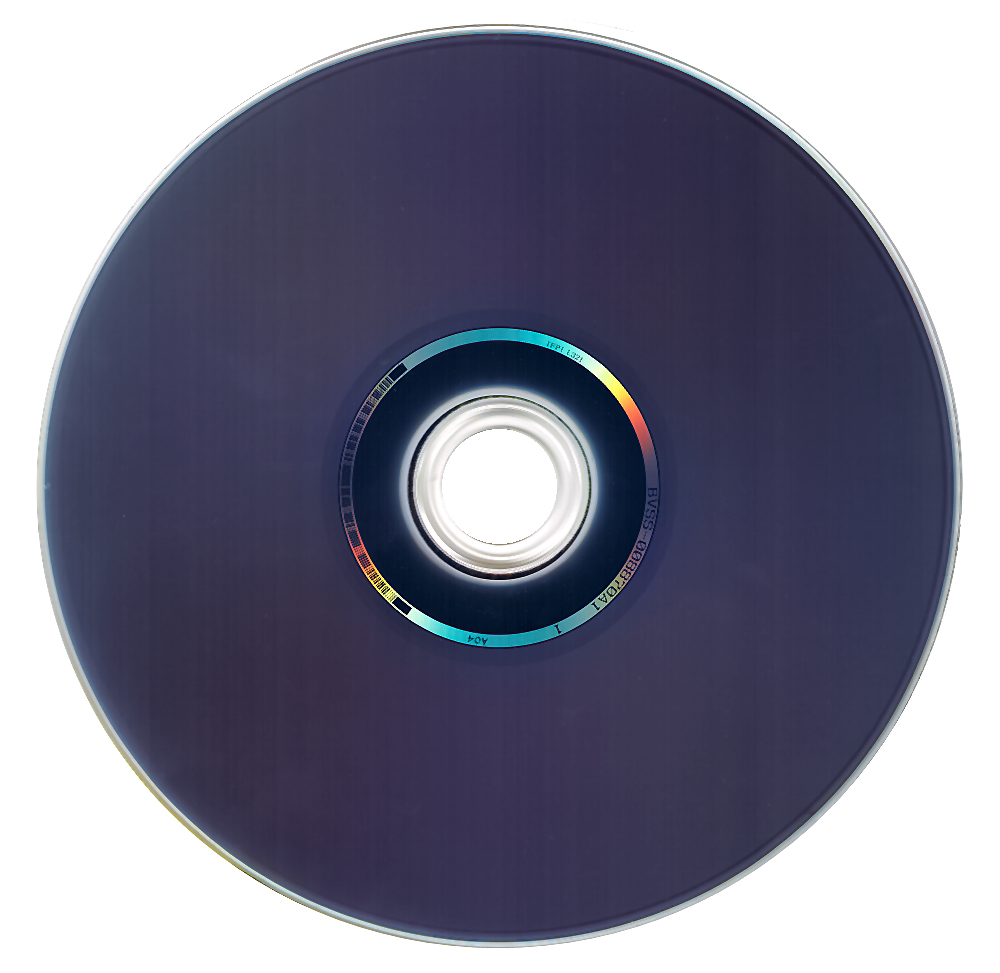
- Reverse (data) side of a Blu-ray. Unlike CD and DVD, the reflection has a blue hue. Branded colors include silver, gold, and grey.
- Media type: High-density optical disc
- Encoding: Data encoding: CLV or Zoned CAV pits-and-lands with interleaved error correction code; BDMV Video encoding: H.262/MPEG-2 Part 2; H.264/MPEG-4 AVC; VC-1; H.265/HEVC (only Ultra HD Blu-ray)
- Capacity: 25 GB (single-layer); 50, 66 GB (dual-layer) BDXL: 100 GB (triple-layer), 128 GB (quad-layer); 200 GB (double-sided, 2×100 GB triple-layer) (Up to four layers are possible in a standard form BD)
- Block size: 2 KB sector, 64 KB ECC-block
- Read mechanism: 405 nm diode laser, 36 Mbit/s
- Write mechanism: 405 nm diode laser with a focused beam using more power than for reading
- Developed by: Sony; Panasonic; Philips; Pioneer Corporation; Blu-ray Disc Association
- Dimensions: Diameter: 120 mm (4.7 in); Thickness: 1.20 mm (0.047 in) (Note: This is the same as previous optical media formats compact disc and DVD. Exact composition is different as stated in the body of the article.)
- Weight: approx. 20 g (0.71 oz)
- Usage: Data storage; High-definition video; High-resolution audio; Stereoscopic 3D; PlayStation 3 games; PlayStation 4 games; Xbox One games; Xbox Series X games
- Extended from: DVD
- Extended to: Ultra HD Blu-ray; Archival Disc
- Released: June 20, 2006 (20 years ago)

Blu-ray (Blu-ray Disc or BD) is a digital optical disc data storage format designed to supersede the DVD format. It was invented and developed in the early-mid 2000s and released worldwide on June 20, 2006, capable of storing several hours of high-definition video (HDTV 720p and 1080p). The main application of Blu-ray is as a medium for video material such as feature films and for the physical distribution of video games for the PlayStation 3, PlayStation 4, PlayStation 5, Xbox One, and Xbox Series X. The name refers to the blue laser used to read the disc, which allows information to be stored at a greater density than is possible with the longer-wavelength red laser used for DVDs, resulting in an increased capacity.

The polycarbonate disc is 12 centimetres (4 3/4 inches) in diameter and 1.2 millimetres (1/16 inch) thick, the same size as DVDs and CDs. Conventional (or "pre-BDXL") Blu-ray discs contain 25 GB per layer, with dual-layer discs (50 GB) being the industry standard for feature-length video discs. Triple-layer discs (100 GB) and quadruple-layer discs (128 GB) are available for BDXL re-writer drives.

While the DVD-Video specification has a maximum resolution of 480p (NTSC, 720 × 480 pixels) or 576p (PAL, 720 × 576 pixels), the initial specification for storing movies on Blu-ray discs defined a maximum resolution of 1080p (1920 × 1080 pixels) at up to 24 progressive or 29.97 interlaced frames per second. Revisions to the specification allowed newer Blu-ray players to support videos with a resolution of 1440 × 1080 pixels, with Ultra HD Blu-ray players extending the maximum resolution to 4K (3840 × 2160 pixels) and progressive frame rates up to 60 frames per second. Aside from an 8K resolution (7680 × 4320 pixels) Blu-ray format exclusive to Japan, videos with non-standard resolutions must use letterboxing to conform to a resolution supported by the Blu-ray specification. Besides these hardware specifications, Blu-ray is associated with a set of multimedia formats. Given that Blu-ray discs can contain ordinary computer files, there is no fixed limit as to which resolution of video can be stored when not conforming to the official specifications.

The BD format was developed by the Blu-ray Disc Association, a group representing makers of consumer electronics, computer hardware, and motion pictures. Sony unveiled the first Blu-ray Disc prototypes in October 2000, and the first prototype player was released in Japan in April 2003. Afterward, it continued to be developed until its official worldwide release on June 20, 2006, beginning the high-definition optical disc format war, where Blu-ray Disc competed with the HD DVD format. Toshiba, the main company supporting HD DVD, discontinued the format in February 2008, and later released its own Blu-ray Disc player in late 2009. According to Media Research, high-definition software sales in the United States were slower in the first two years than DVD software sales. Blu-ray's competition includes video on demand (VOD) and DVD.

== History ==
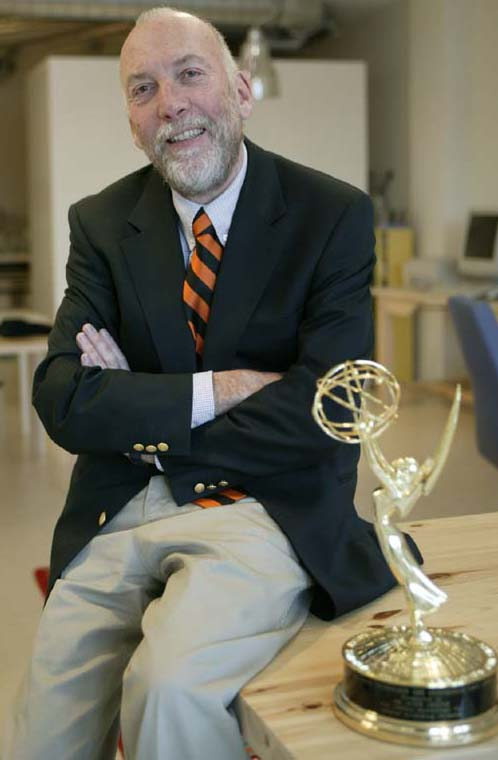
Kees Schouhamer Immink received a personal Emmy award for his pioneering contributions to the DVD and the Blu-ray Disc.

=== Early history ===
The information density of the DVD format was limited by the wavelength of the laser diodes used. Following protracted development, blue laser diodes operating at 405 nanometers became available on a production basis, allowing for the development of a denser storage format that could hold higher-definition media, with prototype discs made with diodes at a slightly longer wavelength of 407 nanometers in October 1998. Sony commenced two projects in collaboration with Panasonic, Philips, and TDK, applying the new diodes: UDO (Ultra Density Optical), and DVR Blue (together with Pioneer), a format of rewritable discs that would eventually become Blu-ray Disc (more specifically, BD-RE). The core technologies of the formats are similar. The first DVR Blue prototypes were unveiled by Sony at the CEATEC exhibition in October 2000. A trademark for the "Blue Disc" logo was filed on February 9, 2001. On February 19, 2002, the project was officially announced as Blu-ray Disc, and Blu-ray Disc Founders was founded by the nine initial members.

The first consumer device arrived in stores on April 10, 2003: the Sony BDZ-S77, a US$3,800 BD-RE recorder that was made available only in Japan. However, there was no standard for pre-recorded video, and no movies were released for this player. Hollywood studios insisted that players be equipped with digital rights management before they would release movies for the new format, and they wanted a new DRM system that would protect more against unauthorized copying than the failed Content Scramble System (CSS) used on DVDs. On October 4, 2004, the name Blu-ray Disc Founders was officially changed to the Blu-ray Disc Association (BDA), and 20th Century Fox joined the BDA's Board of Directors. The Blu-ray Disc physical specifications were completed in 2004.

The recording layer on which the data is stored lies under a 0.1 mm protective layer and on top of a 1.1 mm substrate made of polycarbonate plastic, compared to 0.6 mm on either side on DVDs. Sony also announced in April 2004 a version using paper as the substrate developed with Toppan Printing, with up to 25 GB storage.

In January 2005, TDK announced that it had developed an ultra-hard yet very thin polymer coating called Durabis for Blu-ray Discs; this was a significant technical advance because a far tougher protection was desired in the consumer market to protect bare discs against scratching and damage compared to DVD, given that Blu-ray Discs technically required a much thinner layer for the denser and higher-frequency blue laser. Cartridges, originally used for scratch protection, were no longer necessary and were scrapped. The BD-ROM specifications were finalized in early 2006.

Advanced Access Content System Licensing Administrator (AACS LA), a consortium founded in 2004, had been developing the DRM platform that could be used to distribute movies to consumers while preventing copying. However, the final AACS standard was delayed, and then delayed again when an important member of the Blu-ray Disc group voiced concerns. At the request of the initial hardware manufacturers, including Toshiba, Pioneer, and Samsung, an interim standard was published that did not include some features, such as managed copy, which would have let end users create copies limited to personal use.

=== Launch and sales developments ===
The first BD-ROM players (Samsung BD-P1000) were shipped in mid-June 2006, though HD DVD players beat them to market by a few months. The first Blu-ray Disc titles were released on June 20, 2006: 50 First Dates, The Fifth Element, Hitch, House of Flying Daggers, Underworld: Evolution, xXx (all from Sony), and MGM's The Terminator. The earliest releases used MPEG-2 video compression, the same method used on standard DVDs. The first releases using the newer VC-1 and AVC formats were introduced in September 2006. The first movies using 50 GB dual-layer discs were introduced in October 2006. The first audio-only albums were released in May 2008.

By June 2008, over 2,500 Blu-ray Disc titles were available in Australia and the United Kingdom, with 3,500 in the United States and Canada. In Japan, over 3,300 titles had been released as of July 2010.

=== Competition from HD DVD ===
The DVD Forum, chaired by Toshiba, was split over whether to develop the more expensive blue laser technology. In March 2002 the forum approved a proposal, which was endorsed by Warner Bros. and other motion picture studios. The proposal involved compressing high-definition video onto dual-layer standard DVD-9 discs. In spite of this decision, however, the DVD Forum's Steering Committee announced in April that it was pursuing its own blue-laser high-definition video solution. In August, Toshiba and NEC announced their competing standard, the Advanced Optical Disc. It was finally adopted by the DVD Forum and renamed HD DVD the next year, after being voted down twice by DVD Forum members who were also Blu-ray Disc Association members—a situation that drew preliminary investigations by the U.S. Department of Justice.

HD DVD had a head start in the high-definition video market, as Blu-ray Disc sales were slow to gain market share. The first Blu-ray Disc player was perceived as expensive and buggy, and there were few titles available.

The Sony PlayStation 3, which contained a Blu-ray Disc player for primary storage, helped support Blu-ray. Sony also ran a more thorough and influential marketing campaign for the format. AVCHD camcorders were also introduced in 2006. These recordings can be played back on many Blu-ray Disc players without re-encoding but are not compatible with HD DVD players. By January 2007, Blu-ray Discs had outsold HD DVDs, and during the first three quarters of 2007, BD outsold HD DVD by about two to one. At CES 2007, Warner proposed Total Hi Def—a hybrid disc containing Blu-ray on one side and HD DVD on the other, but it was never released.

On June 28, 2007, 20th Century Fox cited Blu-ray Discs' adoption of the BD+ anticopying system as key to their decision to support the Blu-ray Disc format.

On January 4, 2008, a day before CES 2008, Warner Bros., the only major studio still releasing movies in both HD DVD and Blu-ray Disc format, announced that it would release only in Blu-ray after May 2008. This effectively included other studios that came under the Warner umbrella, such as New Line Cinema and HBO—though in Europe, HBO's distribution partner, the BBC, announced it would continue to release product on both formats while keeping an eye on market forces. This led to a chain reaction in the industry, with major American retailers such as Best Buy, Walmart, and Circuit City and Canadian chains such as Future Shop dropping HD DVD in their stores. Woolworths, then a major European retailer, dropped HD DVD from its inventory. Major DVD rental companies Netflix and Blockbuster said they would no longer carry HD DVD.

Following these new developments, on February 19, 2008, Toshiba announced it would end production of HD DVD devices, allowing Blu-ray Disc to become the industry standard for high-density optical discs. Universal Studios, the sole major studio to back HD DVD since its inception, said shortly after Toshiba's announcement: "While Universal values the close partnership we have shared with Toshiba, it is time to turn our focus to releasing new and catalog titles on Blu-ray Disc." Paramount Pictures, which started releasing movies only in HD DVD format during late 2007, also said it would start releasing on Blu-ray Disc. Both studios announced initial Blu-ray lineups in May 2008. With this, all major Hollywood studios supported Blu-ray.

=== Ongoing development ===
==== 2005–2010 ====
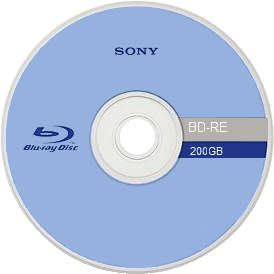
Front (label side) of an experimental 200 GB rewritable Blu-ray Disc

Although the Blu-ray Disc specification has been finalized, engineers continue to work on advancing the technology. By 2005, quad-layer (100 GB) discs had been demonstrated on a drive with modified optics and standard unaltered optics. Hitachi stated that such a disc could be used to store 7 hours of 32 Mbit/s video (HDTV) or 3 hours and 30 minutes of 64 Mbit/s video (ultra-high-definition television). In April 2006, TDK canceled plans to produce 8-layer 200 GB Blu-ray Discs. In August 2006, TDK announced that it had created a working experimental Blu-ray Disc capable of holding 200 GB of data on a single side, using six 33 GB data layers. In 2007, Hitachi was reported to have plans to produce 200 GB discs by 2009.

Behind closed doors at CES 2007, Ritek revealed that it had successfully developed a high-definition optical disc process that extended the disc capacity to ten layers, increasing the capacity of the discs to 250 GB. However, it noted the major obstacle was that current read/write technology did not allow additional layers. JVC developed a three-layer technology that allows putting both standard-definition DVD data and HD data on a BD/(standard) DVD combination. This would have enabled the consumer to purchase a disc that can be played on DVD players and can also reveal its HD version when played on a BD player. Japanese optical disc manufacturer Infinity announced the first "hybrid" Blu-ray Disc/(standard) DVD combo, to be released on February 18, 2009. This disc set of the TV series Code Blue featured four hybrid discs containing a single Blu-ray Disc layer (25 GB) and two DVD layers (9 GB) on the same side of the disc.

In January 2007, Hitachi showcased a 100 GB Blu-ray Disc, consisting of four layers containing 25 GB each. It claimed that, unlike TDK's and Panasonic's 100 GB discs, this disc would be readable on standard Blu-ray Disc drives that were currently in circulation, and it was believed that a firmware update was the only requirement to make it readable by then-current players and drives. In October 2007, they revealed a 100 GB Blu-ray Disc drive. In December 2008, Pioneer unveiled a 400 GB Blu-ray Disc (containing 16 data layers, 25 GB each) compatible with current players after a firmware update. Its planned launch was in the 2009–10 time frame for ROM and 2010–13 for rewritable discs. Ongoing development was underway to create a 1 TB Blu-ray Disc. In October 2009, TDK demonstrated a 10-layer 320 GB Blu-ray Disc.

At CES 2009, Panasonic unveiled the DMP-B15, the first portable Blu-ray Disc player, and Sharp introduced the LC-BD60U and LC-BD80U series, the first LCD HDTVs with integrated Blu-ray Disc players. Sharp also announced that it would sell HDTVs with integrated Blu-ray Disc recorders in the United States by the end of 2009. Set-top box recorders were not being sold in the U.S. for fear of unauthorized copying. However, personal computers with Blu-ray recorder drives were available.

On January 1, 2010, Sony, in association with Panasonic, announced plans to increase the storage capacity on their Blu-ray Discs from 25 GB to 33.4 GB via a technology called i-MLSE (maximum likelihood sequence estimation). The higher-capacity discs, according to Sony, would be readable on existing Blu-ray Disc players with a firmware upgrade. This technology was later used on BDXL discs.

On July 20, 2010, the research team of Sony and Tohoku University announced the joint development of a blue-violet laser, to help create Blu-ray Discs with a capacity of 1 TB using only two layers (and potentially more than 1 TB with additional layering). By comparison, the first blue laser was invented in 1996, with the first prototype discs coming four years later.

==== 2011–2015 ====
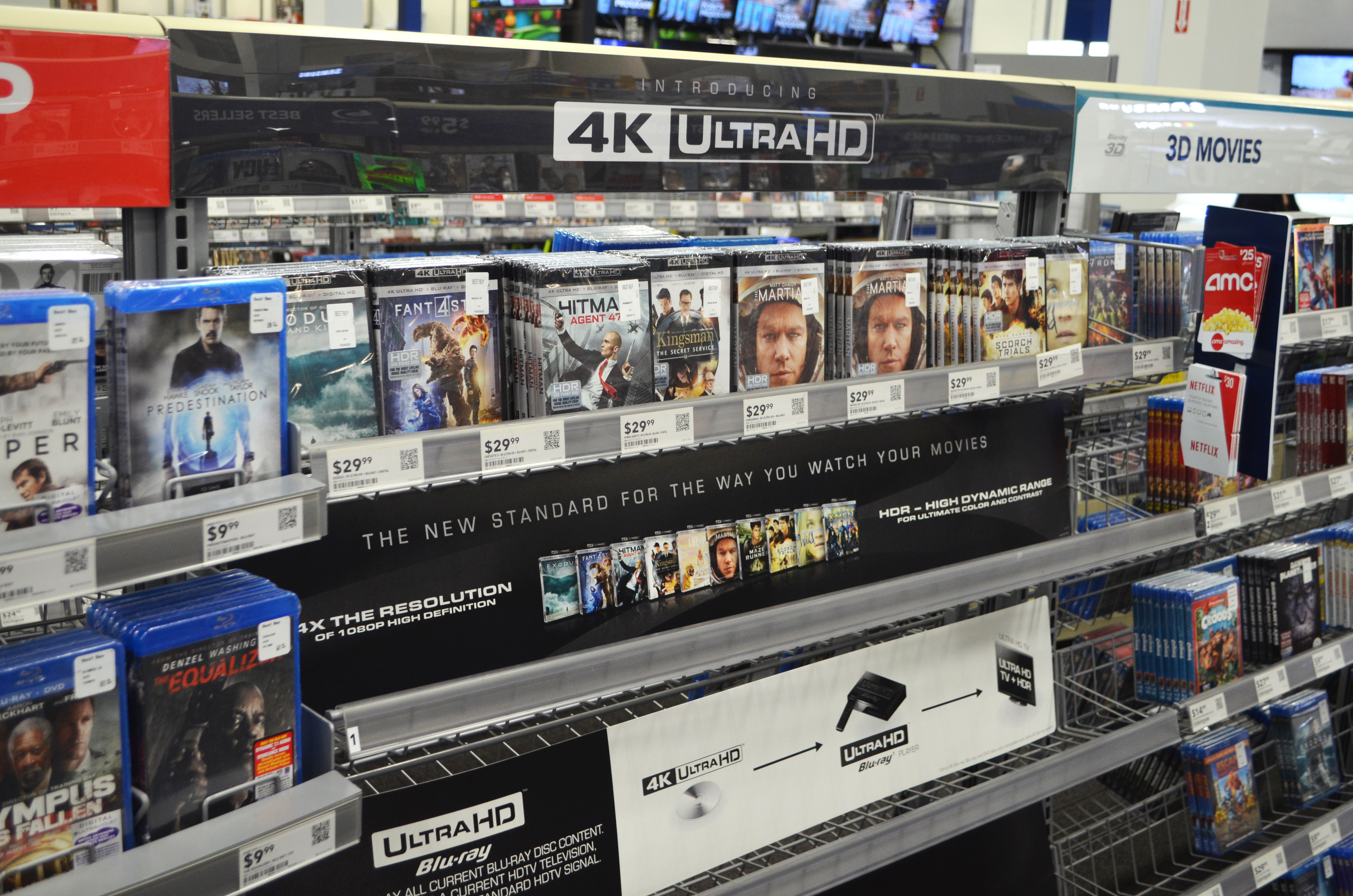
Early 4K Blu-ray release at Best Buy. A 4K Blu-ray Disc player was also released.

On January 7, 2013, Sony announced that it would release "Mastered in 4K" Blu-ray Disc titles sourced at 4K and encoded at 1080p. "Mastered in 4K" Blu-ray Disc titles can be played on existing Blu-ray Disc players and have a larger color space using xvYCC. On January 14, 2013, Blu-ray Disc Association president Andy Parsons stated that a task force was created three months prior to conduct a study concerning an extension to the Blu-ray Disc specification that would add the ability to contain 4K UHD video.

On August 5, 2015, the BDA announced it would commence licensing the Ultra HD Blu-ray video format starting on August 24, 2015. The Ultra HD Blu-ray format delivered support for high dynamic range video that significantly expanded the range between the brightest and darkest elements, an expanded color range, a high frame rate of up to 60 frames per second for a smoother motion appearance, an increase of the supported resolution to 3840 × 2160 for a more detailed picture, object-based sound formats, and an optional "digital bridge" feature. New players were required to play this format, and they became able to play all three of DVDs, traditional Blu-rays, and the new format. New Ultra HD Blu-ray Discs hold up to 66 GB and 100 GB of data on dual- and triple-layer discs, respectively.

Blu-ray's physical and file system specifications are publicly available on the BDA's website.

=== Future scope and market trends ===
According to Media Research, high-definition software sales in the United States were slower in the first two years than DVD software sales. 16.3 million DVD software units were sold in the first two years (1997–1998) compared to 8.3 million high-definition software units (2006–2007). One reason given for this difference was the smaller marketplace (26.5 million HDTVs in 2007 compared to 100 million SDTVs in 1998). Former HD DVD supporter Microsoft did not make a Blu-ray Disc drive for the Xbox 360. The 360's successor Xbox One features a Blu-ray drive, as does the PS4, with both supporting 3D Blu-ray after later firmware updates.

Shortly after the "format war" ended, Blu-ray Disc sales began to increase. A study by the NPD Group found that awareness of Blu-ray Disc had reached 60% of households in the United States. Nielsen VideoScan sales numbers showed that for some titles, such as 20th Century Fox's Hitman, up to 14% of total disc sales were from Blu-ray, although the average Blu-ray sales for the first half of the year were only around 5%. In December 2008, the Blu-ray Disc version of Warner Bros.' The Dark Knight sold 600,000 copies on the first day of its launch in the United States, Canada, and the United Kingdom. A week after the launch, The Dark Knight BD had sold over 1.7 million copies worldwide, making it the first Blu-ray Disc title to sell over a million copies in the first week of release.

Blu-ray Disc sales in United States and Canada
Year	Cumulative sales (millions)
2006	1.2
2007	19.2
2008	82.9
2009	177.2
2010	350

According to Singulus Technologies AG, Blu-ray was adopted faster than the DVD format was at a similar period in its development. This conclusion was based on the fact that Singulus Technologies received orders for 21 Blu-ray dual-layer replication machines during the first quarter of 2008, while 17 DVD replication machines of this type were made in the same period in 1997. According to GfK Retail and Technology, in the first week of November 2008, sales of Blu-ray recorders surpassed DVD recorders in Japan. According to the Digital Entertainment Group, the number of Blu-ray Disc playback devices (both set-top box and game console) sold in the United States had reached 28.5 million by the end of 2010.

Blu-ray faces competition from video on demand and from new technologies that allow access to movies on any format or device, such as Digital Entertainment Content Ecosystem or Disney's Keychest. Some commentators suggested that renting Blu-ray would play a vital part in keeping the technology affordable while allowing it to move forward. In an effort to increase sales, studios began releasing films in combo packs with Blu-ray Discs and DVDs, as well as digital copies that can be played on computers and mobile devices. Some are released on "flipper" discs with Blu-ray on one side and DVD on the other. Other strategies are to release movies with the special features only on Blu-ray Discs and none on DVDs.

Blu-ray Discs cost around the same amount to manufacture as DVDs. However, reading and writing mechanisms are more complicated, making Blu-ray recorders, drives and players more expensive than their DVD counterparts. Adoption is also limited due to the widespread use of streaming media. Blu-ray Discs are used to distribute PlayStation 3, PlayStation 4, PlayStation 5, Xbox One and Xbox Series X games, and the aforementioned game consoles can play back regular Blu-ray Discs.

In the mid-2010s, the Ultra HD Blu-ray format was released, which is an enhanced variant of Blu-ray compatible with the 4K resolution. Ultra HD Blu-ray discs and players became available in the first quarter of 2016, having a storage capacity of up to 100 GB.

By December 2017, the specification for an 8K Blu-ray format was completed. However, this specification was exclusive to Japan, and was designed to be used by Japanese public broadcasters to broadcast the Tokyo 2020 Olympic Games in 8K resolution.

==== Beyond Blu-ray ====
The Holographic Versatile Disc (HVD), described in the ECMA-377 standard, was in development by the Holography System Development (HSD) Forum using a green writing/reading laser (532 nm) and a red positioning/addressing laser (650 nm). It was to offer MPEG-2, MPEG-4 AVC (H.264), HEVC (H.265), and VC-1 encoding, supporting a maximum storage capacity of 6 TB. No systems conforming to the Ecma International HVD standard have been released. The company responsible for HVD went bankrupt in 2010, making any releases unlikely.

==== Rise of boutique labels ====
A boutique Blu-ray label or specialty Blu-ray label is a home video distributor that releases films on Blu-ray or 4K Ultra HD Blu-ray format, characterized by a specific or niche target market and collectable features like "limited edition" or "special edition" releases, deluxe slipcases or packaging, and other materials. Examples of boutique Blu-ray labels include the American Genre Film Archive (AGFA), Arrow Films, Canadian International Pictures, The Criterion Collection, Kino Lorber, Severin Films, Shout! Factory, Twilight Time, Vinegar Syndrome, and the Warner Archive Collection.

Boutique Blu-ray labels, which are popular among collectors and enthusiasts of film and physical media, have been credited as a factor in a "Blu-ray renaissance" dating back to at least 2018, with some consumers choosing to purchase films on physical formats in an age of digital streaming. Reasons some consumers prefer Blu-rays to streaming include higher video quality, the tactile nature of owning a film physically, elaborate packaging, bonus features, and the desire to own or watch films that are not available in streaming services' libraries.

== Physical media ==
Comparison of several forms of disc storage showing tracks (not to scale); green denotes start and red denotes end. * Some CD-R(W) and DVD-R(W)/DVD+R(W) recorders operate in ZCLV, CAA or CAV modes.

Comparison of various optical storage media

Type	Diameter (cm)	Layers	Capacity	
Type	Diameter (cm)	Layers	Bytes	GiB
Standard disc size, single layer	12	1	25,025,314,816	23.3
Standard disc size, dual layer	12	2	50,050,629,632	46.6
Standard disc size, XL 3 layer	12	3	100,103,356,416	93.2
Standard disc size, XL 4 layer	12	4	128,001,769,472	119.2
Mini disc size, single layer	8	1	7,791,181,824	7.25
Mini disc size, dual layer	8	2	15,582,363,648	14.5

=== Laser and optics ===
While a DVD uses a 650 nm red laser, Blu-ray Disc uses a 405 nm blue laser diode. Although the laser is called blue, its color is actually in the violet range. The shorter wavelength can be focused to a smaller area, thus enabling it to read information recorded in pits that are less than half the size of those on a DVD, and can consequently be spaced more closely, resulting in a shorter track pitch, enabling a Blu-ray Disc to hold about five times the amount of information that can be stored on a DVD. The lasers are GaN (gallium nitride) laser diodes that produce 405 nm light directly, that is, without frequency doubling or other nonlinear optical mechanisms. CDs use 780 nm near-infrared lasers. Some early Pioneer DVD recorders (DVR-S101 and DVR-S201) use 635 nm red laser to precisely write to specialized DVD-R for Authoring media.

The minimum "spot size" on which a laser can be focused is limited by diffraction and depends on the wavelength of the light and the numerical aperture of the lens used to focus it. By decreasing the wavelength, increasing the numerical aperture from 0.60 to 0.85, and making the cover layer thinner to avoid unwanted optical effects, designers can cause the laser beam to focus on a smaller spot, which effectively allows more information to be stored in the same area. For a Blu-ray Disc, the spot size is 580 nm. This allows a reduction of the pit size from 400 nm for DVD to 150 nm for Blu-ray Disc, and of the track pitch from 740 nm to 320 nm (see compact disc for information on optical discs' physical structure). In addition to the optical improvements, Blu-ray Discs feature improvements in data encoding that further increase the amount of content that can be stored.

=== Hard-coating technology ===
Given that the Blu-ray Disc data layer is closer to the surface of the disc compared to the DVD standard, it was found in early designs to be more vulnerable to scratches. The first discs were therefore housed in cartridges for protection, resembling Professional Discs introduced by Sony in 2003. Using a cartridge would increase the price of an already expensive medium, and would increase the size of Blu-ray Disc drives, so designers chose hard-coating of the pickup surface instead. TDK was the first company to develop a working scratch-protection coating for Blu-ray Discs, naming it Durabis. In addition, both Sony's and Panasonic's replication methods include proprietary hard-coat technologies. Sony's rewritable media are spin-coated, using a scratch-resistant acrylic and antistatic coating. Verbatim's recordable and rewritable Blu-ray Discs use their own proprietary technology, called Hard Coat. Colloidal silica-dispersed UV-curable resins are used for the hard coating, given that, according to the Blu-ray Disc Association, they offer the best tradeoff between scratch resistance, optical properties, and productivity.

The Blu-ray Disc specification requires the testing of resistance to scratches by mechanical abrasion. In contrast, DVD media are not required to be scratch-resistant, but since development of the technology, some companies, such as Verbatim, implemented hard-coating for more expensive lines of recordable DVDs.

=== Drive speeds ===
BD drive speeds
Drive speed	Data rate		~Write time (minutes)		~CAV Rotation speed (RPM)
Drive speed	Mbit/s	MB/s	Single-Layer	Dual-Layer	~CAV Rotation speed (RPM)
1×	36	4.5	90	180	810
2×	72	9	45	90	1,620
4×	144	18	22.5	45	3,240
6×	216	27	15	30	4,860
8×	288	36	11.25	22.5	6,480
10×	360	45	9	18	8,100
12×	432	54	7.5	15	9,720
14×	504	63	6.5	13	11,340
16×	576	72	5.7	11.5	12,960

The table shows the speeds available. Even the lowest speed (1×) is sufficient to play and record real-time 1080p video; the higher speeds are relevant for general data storage and more sophisticated handling of video. BD discs are designed to cope with at least 5,000 rpm of rotational speed.

The usable data rate of a Blu-ray Disc drive can be limited by the capacity of the drive's data interface. With a USB 2.0 interface, the maximum exploitable drive speed is 288 Mbit/s or 36 MB/s (also called 8× speed). A USB 3.0 interface (with proper cabling) does not have this limitation, nor do even the oldest version of Serial ATA (SATA, 150 MB/s) nor the latest Parallel ATA (133 MB/s) standards. Internal Blu-ray drives that are integrated into a computer (as opposed to physically separate and connected via a cable) typically have a SATA interface.

More recent half-height Blu-Ray writers have reached writing speeds of up to 16× (constant angular velocity) on single-layer BD-R media, while the highest reading speeds are 12×, presumably to prevent repeated physical stress on the disc. Slim type drives are limited to 6× speeds (constant angular velocity) due to spacial and power limitations.

The Blu-ray format has a write verification feature, similar to that of DVD-RAM, but brings this feature to a write-once disc for the first time. If activated, the correctness of the written data is verified immediately after being written so unreadable data can be written again. In this case, the writing speed is halved because half of the disc rotations are for writing only. "Write verification" is not an official term for the feature, only a description for what it does. The feature may be activated by default, as is the case in the disc writing utility growisofs. Deactivating write verification may be desirable to save time when mass-producing physical copies of data, since errors are unlikely to occur on physically undamaged media.

=== Media quality and data integrity ===
The quality and data integrity of optical media can be determined by measuring the rate of errors, of which higher rates may be an indication for deteriorating media, low-quality media, physical damage such as scratches, dust, and/or media written using a defective optical drive.

Errors on Blu-Ray media are measured using the so-called LDC (Long Distance Codes) and BIS (Burst Indication Subcodes) error parameters, of which rates below 13 and 15 respectively can be considered healthy.

Not all vendors and models of optical drives have error scanning functionality implemented.

=== Packaging ===
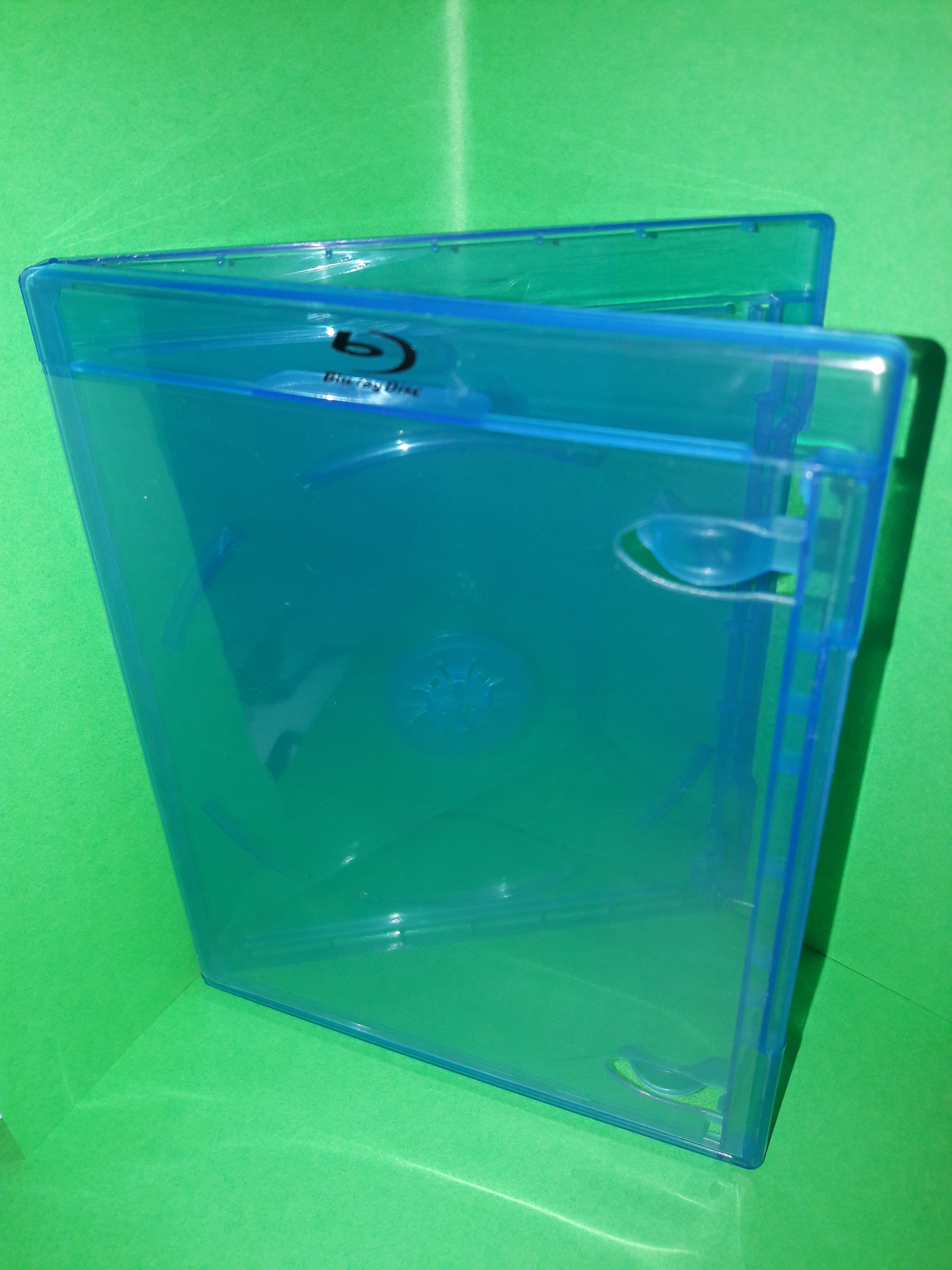
Blu-ray case (often blue-tinted)

Pre-recorded Blu-ray Disc titles usually ship in packages similar to, but slightly smaller (18.5 mm shorter and 2 mm thinner: 135 mm × 171.5 mm × 13 mm) and more rounded than, a standard DVD keep case, generally with the format prominently displayed in a horizontal stripe across the top of the case (translucent blue for Blu-ray video discs, clear for Blu-ray 3D video releases, red for PlayStation 3 Greatest Hits Games, transparent for regular PlayStation 3 games, transparent dark blue for PlayStation 4 and PlayStation 5 games, transparent green for Xbox One and Xbox Series X games and black for Ultra HD Blu-ray video releases). Warren Osborn and The Seastone Media Group, LLC created the package that was adopted worldwide following the Blu-ray versus HD DVD market adoption choice. Because Blu-ray cases are smaller than DVD cases, more Blu-rays than DVDs can fit on a shelf.

=== Types ===
==== BD-ROM ====
"Blu-ray Disc Read-Only Memory", or BD-ROM, is the technical term used for standard, factory-pressed Blu-ray discs. The content of these discs is written once and cannot be modified, and they can't be created by consumer optical disc recorders.

==== Mini Blu-ray Disc ====
The "Mini Blu-ray Disc" (also, "Mini-BD" and "Mini Blu-ray") is a compact 8-centimetre-diameter (3.1 in) variant of the Blu-ray Disc that can store 7.8 GB of data in its single-layer configuration, or 15.6 GB on a dual-layer disc. It is similar in concept to the MiniDVD and Mini CD. Recordable (BD-R) and rewritable (BD-RE) versions of Mini Blu-ray Disc have been developed specifically for compact camcorders and other compact recording devices.

==== Blu-ray Disc recordable ====
"Blu-ray Disc recordable" (BD-R) refers to two optical disc formats that can be recorded with an optical disc recorder. BD-Rs can be written to once, whereas Blu-ray Disc Recordable Erasable (BD-REs) can be erased and re-recorded multiple times. The current practical maximum speed for Blu-ray Discs is about 12× (54 MB/s). Higher speeds of rotation (5,000+ rpm) cause too much wobble for the discs to be written properly, as with the 24× (33.2 MB/s) and 56× (8.2 MB/s, 11,200 rpm) maximum speeds, respectively, of standard DVDs and CDs. Since September 2007, BD-RE is also available in the smaller 8 cm Mini Blu-ray Disc size.

On September 18, 2007, Pioneer and Mitsubishi codeveloped BD-R LTH ("Low to High" in groove recording), which features an organic dye recording layer that can be manufactured by modifying existing CD-R and DVD-R production equipment, significantly reducing manufacturing costs. In February 2008, Taiyo Yuden, Mitsubishi, and Maxell released the first BD-R LTH Discs, and in March 2008, Sony's PlayStation 3 officially gained the ability to use BD-R LTH Discs with the 2.20 firmware update. In May 2009 Verbatim/Mitsubishi announced the industry's first 6X BD-R LTH media, which allows recording a 25 GB disc in about 16 minutes. Unlike with the previous releases of 120 mm optical discs (i.e. CDs and standard DVDs), Blu-ray recorders hit the market almost simultaneously with Blu-ray's debut.

==== BD9 and BD5 ====
The BD9 format was proposed to the Blu-ray Disc Association by Warner Home Video as a cost-effective alternative to the 25/50 GB BD-ROM discs. The format was supposed to use the same codecs and program structure as Blu-ray Disc video but recorded onto less expensive 8.5 GB dual-layer DVD. This red-laser media could be manufactured on existing DVD production lines with lower costs of production than the 25/50 GB Blu-ray media.

Usage of BD9 for releasing content on "pressed" discs never caught on. With the end of the format war, manufacturers ramped production of Blu-ray Discs and lowered prices to compete with DVDs. On the other hand, the idea of using inexpensive DVD media became popular among individual users. A lower-capacity version of this format that uses single-layer 4.7 GB DVDs has been unofficially called BD5. Both formats are being used by individuals for recording high-definition content in Blu-ray format onto recordable DVD media. Despite the fact that the BD9 format has been adopted as part of the BD-ROM basic format, none of the existing Blu-ray player models explicitly claim to be able to read it. Consequently, the discs recorded in BD9 and BD5 formats are not guaranteed to play on standard Blu-ray Disc players. AVCHD and AVCREC also use inexpensive media like DVDs, but unlike BD9 and BD5 these formats have limited interactivity, codec types, and data rates. As of March 2011, BD9 was removed as an official BD-ROM disc.

==== BDXL ====
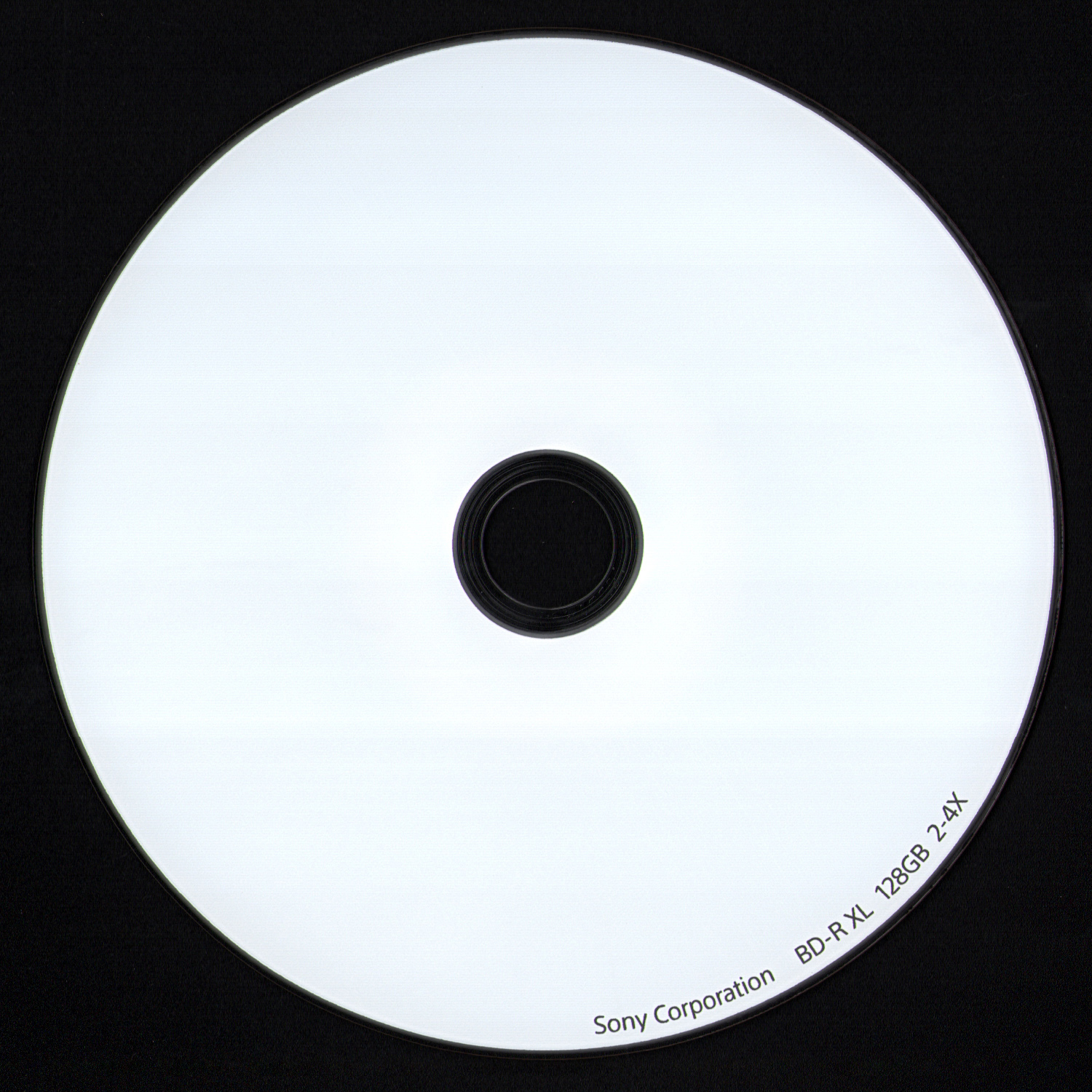
128 GB BDXL quadruple-layer disc manufactured by Sony Corporation

The BDXL format for recordable Blu-ray discs allows 100 GB and 128 GB write-once discs, and 100 GB rewritable discs for commercial applications. The BDXL specification was finalised in June 2010. BD-R 3.0 Format Specification (BDXL) defined a multi-layered disc recordable in BDAV format with the speed of 2× and 4×, capable of 100/128 GB and usage of UDF2.5/2.6. BD-RE 4.0 Format Specification (BDXL) defined a multi-layered disc rewritable in BDAV with the speed of 2× and 4×, capable of 100 GB and usage of UDF2.5 as file system.

Although the 66 GB and 100 GB BD-ROM discs used for Ultra HD Blu-ray use the same linear density as BDXL, the two formats are not compatible with each other, therefore it is not possible to use a triple layer BDXL disc to burn an Ultra HD Blu-ray Disc playable in an Ultra HD Blu-ray player, although standard 50 GB BD-R dual-layer discs can be burned in the Ultra HD Blu-ray format.

==== IH-BD ====
The IH-BD (Intra-Hybrid Blu-ray) format includes a 25 GB rewritable layer (BD-RE) and a 25 GB write-once layer (BD-R), designed to work with existing Blu-ray Discs.

== Data format standards ==
=== Filesystem ===
Blu-ray Disc specifies the use of Universal Disk Format (UDF) 2.50 as a convergent-friendly format for both PC and consumer electronics environments. It is used in the latest specifications of BD-ROM, BD-RE, and BD-R. In the first BD-RE specification (defined in 2002), the BDFS (Blu-ray Disc File System) was used. The BD-RE 1.0 specification was defined mainly for the digital recording of high-definition television (HDTV) broadcast television. The BDFS was replaced by UDF 2.50 in the second BD-RE specification in 2005, to enable interoperability among consumer electronics, Blu-ray recorders, and personal computer systems. These optical disc recording technologies enabled PC recording and playback of BD-RE. BD-R can use UDF 2.50/2.60.

The Blu-ray Disc application for recording of digital broadcasting has been developed as System Description Blu-ray Rewritable Disc Format Part 3 Audio Visual Basic Specifications (BDAV). The requirements related to the computer file system have been specified in System Description Blu-ray Rewritable Disc Format part 2 File System Specifications version 1.0 (BDFS). Initially, the BD-RE version 1.0 (BDFS) was specifically developed for recording of digital broadcasts using the Blu-ray Disc application (BDAV application). But these requirements are superseded by the Blu-ray Rewritable Disc File System Specifications version 2.0 (UDF) (a.k.a. RE 2.0) and Blu-ray Recordable Disc File System Specifications version 1.0 (UDF) (a.k.a. R 1.0). Additionally, a new application format, BDMV (System Description Blu-ray Disc Prerecorded Format part 3 Audio Visual Basic Specifications) for High Definition Content Distribution was developed for BD-ROM. The only file system developed for BDMV is the System Description Blu-ray Read-Only Disc Format part 2 File System Specifications version 1.0 (UDF) which defines the requirements for UDF 2.50. All BDMV application files are stored under a "BDMV" directory.

=== Application format ===
- BDAV or BD-AV (Blu-ray Disc Audio/Visual): a consumer-oriented Blu-ray video format used for audio/video recording (defined in 2002).
- BDMV or BD-MV (Blu-ray Disc Movie): a Blu-ray video format with menu capability commonly used for movie releases.
- BDMV Recording specification (defined in September 2006 for BD-RE and BD-R).
- RREF (Realtime Recording and Editing Format): a subset of BDMV designed for real-time recording and editing applications.
- HFPA (High Fidelity Pure Audio): A high definition audio disc using the Blu-ray format

=== Media format ===
==== Container format ====
Audio, video, and other streams are multiplexed and stored on Blu-ray Discs in a container format based on the MPEG transport stream. It is also known as BDAV MPEG-2 transport stream and can use the filename extension .m2ts. Blu-ray Disc titles authored with menus are in the BDMV (Blu-ray Disc Movie) format and contain audio, video, and other streams in BDAV container. There is also the BDAV (Blu-ray Disc Audio/Visual) format, the consumer oriented alternative to the BDMV format used for movie releases. The BDAV format is used on BD-REs and BD-Rs for audio/video recording. BDMV format was later defined also for BD-RE and BD-R (in September 2006, in the third revision of BD-RE specification and second revision of BD-R specification).

Blu-ray Disc employs the MPEG transport stream recording method. That enables transport streams of digital broadcasts to be recorded as they are broadcast, without altering the format. It also enables flexible editing of a digital broadcast that is recorded as is and where the data can be edited just by rewriting the playback stream. Although it is quite natural, a function for high-speed and easy-to-use retrieval is built in. Blu-ray Disc Video use MPEG transport streams, compared to DVD's MPEG program streams. An MPEG transport stream contains one or more MPEG program streams, so this allows multiple video programs to be stored in the same file so they can be played back simultaneously (e.g., with the "picture-in-picture" effect).

===== Subtitles =====
Blu-ray HDMV/BDMV can contain up to 32 subtitles tracks in the Presentation Graphic Stream (PGS) bitmap format, embedded in the BDAV container. The PGS format supports 8 bits per color and 8 bits of transparency. Text subtitles may also be supported.

==== Codecs ====
The BD-ROM specification mandates certain codec compatibilities for both hardware decoders (players) and movie software (content). Windows Media Player does not come with all of the codecs required to play Blu-ray Discs.

===== Video =====
Originally, BD-ROMs stored video up to 1920 × 1080 pixel resolution at up to 60 (59.94) fields per second. Currently, with UHD BD-ROM, videos can be stored at a maximum of 3840 × 2160 pixel resolution at up to 60 (59.94) frames per second, progressively scanned. While most current Blu-ray players and recorders can read and write 1920 × 1080 video at the full 59.94p and 50p progressive format, new players for the UHD specifications will be able to read at 3840 × 2160 video at either 59.94p and 50p formats.

Supported video formats
Format	Resolution and frame/field rate	Display aspect ratio
4K UHD (Note: Only supported on UltraHD Blu-ray with HEVC video compression standard.)	3840 × 2160p 60	16:9
4K UHD	3840 × 2160p 59.94	16:9
4K UHD	3840 × 2160p 50	16:9
4K UHD	3840 × 2160p 30	16:9
4K UHD	3840 × 2160p 29.970	16:9
4K UHD	3840 × 2160p 25	16:9
4K UHD	3840 × 2160p 24	16:9
4K UHD	3840 × 2160p 23.976	16:9
HD	1920 × 1080p 60	16:9
HD	1920 × 1080p 59.94	16:9
HD	1920 × 1080p 50	16:9
HD	1920 × 1080p 30	16:9
HD	1920 × 1080p 29.970	16:9
HD	1920 × 1080p 25	16:9
HD	1920 × 1080i 59.94 (Note: Field rate of interlaced video. Frame rate for interlaced video is usually half of the field rate, but may also match the field rate.)	16:9
HD	1920 × 1080i 50	16:9
HD	1920 × 1080p 24	16:9
HD	1920 × 1080p 23.976	16:9
HD	1440 × 1080i 59.94 (Note: MPEG-2 at 1440 × 1080 was previously not included in a draft version of the specification from March 2005.)	16:9 (Note: These resolutions are stored anamorphically, i.e. they are stretched to the display aspect ratio by the player or display.)
HD	1440 × 1080i 50	16:9
HD	1440 × 1080p 24	16:9
HD	1440 × 1080p 23.976	16:9
HD	1280 × 720p 59.94	16:9
HD	1280 × 720p 50	16:9
HD	1280 × 720p 29.970	16:9
HD	1280 × 720p 25	16:9
HD	1280 × 720p 24	16:9
HD	1280 × 720p 23.976	16:9
SD	720 × 480i 59.94	4:3 or 16:9
SD	720 × 576i 50	4:3 or 16:9

For video, all players are required to process H.262/MPEG-2 Part 2, H.264/MPEG-4 Part 10: AVC, and SMPTE VC-1. BD-ROM titles with video must store video using one of the three mandatory formats; multiple formats on a single title are allowed. Blu-ray Disc allows video with a bit depth of 8-bits per color YCbCr with 4:2:0 chroma subsampling. The choice of formats affects the producer's licensing/royalty costs as well as the title's maximum run time, due to differences in compression efficiency. Discs encoded in MPEG-2 video typically limit content producers to around two hours of high-definition content on a single-layer (25 GB) BD-ROM. The more-advanced video formats (VC-1 and MPEG-4 AVC) typically achieve a video run time twice that of MPEG-2, with comparable quality. MPEG-2, however, does have the advantage that it is available without licensing costs, as all MPEG-2 patents have expired.

MPEG-2 was used by many studios (including Paramount Pictures, which initially used the VC-1 format for HD DVD releases) for the first series of Blu-ray Discs, which were launched throughout 2006. Modern releases are now often encoded in either MPEG-4 AVC or VC-1, allowing film studios to place all content on one disc, reducing costs and improving ease of use. Using these formats also frees a lot of space for storage of bonus content in HD (1080i/p), as opposed to the SD (480i/p) typically used for most titles. Some studios, such as Warner Bros., have released bonus content on discs encoded in a different format than the main feature title. For example, the Blu-ray Disc release of Superman Returns uses VC-1 for the feature film and MPEG-2 for some of its bonus content.

===== Audio =====
For audio, BD-ROM players are required to implement Dolby Digital (AC-3), DTS, and linear PCM. Players may optionally implement Dolby Digital Plus and DTS-HD High Resolution Audio as well as lossless 5.1 and 7.1 surround sound formats Dolby TrueHD and DTS-HD Master Audio. BD-ROM titles must use one of the mandatory schemes for the primary soundtrack. A secondary audiotrack, if present, may use any of the mandatory or optional codecs.

Specification of BD-ROM Primary audio streams
	LPCM (Uncompressed)	Dolby Digital	Dolby Digital Plus	Dolby TrueHD (Lossless)	DTS Digital Surround	DTS-HD Master Audio (Lossless)	DRA	DRA extension
Max. bitrate	27.648 Mbit/s	640 kbit/s	4.736 Mbit/s	18.64 Mbit/s	1.524 Mbit/s	24.5 Mbit/s	1.5 Mbit/s	3.0 Mbit/s
Max. channel	8 (48 kHz, 96 kHz), 6 (192 kHz)	5.1	7.1	8 (48 kHz, 96 kHz), 6 (192 kHz)	5.1	8 (48 kHz, 96 kHz), 6 (192 kHz)	5.1	7.1
Bits/sample	16, 20, 24	16, 24	16, 24	16, 24	16, 20, 24	16, 24	16	16
Sample frequency	48 kHz, 96 kHz, 192 kHz	48 kHz	48 kHz	48 kHz, 96 kHz, 192 kHz	48 kHz	48 kHz, 96 kHz, 192 kHz	48 kHz	48 kHz, 96 kHz

==== Bit rate ====
The Blu-ray specification defines a maximum data transfer rate of 54 Mbit/s, a maximum AV bitrate of 48 Mbit/s (for both audio and video data), and a maximum video bit rate of 40 Mbit/s. In contrast, the HD DVD standard has a maximum data transfer rate of 36 Mbit/s, a maximum AV bitrate of 30.24 Mbit/s, and a maximum video bitrate of 29.4 Mbit/s.

=== Java software interface ===
At the 2005 JavaOne trade show, it was announced that Sun Microsystems' Java cross-platform software environment would be included in all Blu-ray Disc players as a mandatory part of the standard. Java is used to implement interactive menus on Blu-ray Discs, as opposed to the method used on DVD-video discs. DVDs use pre-rendered MPEG segments and selectable subtitle pictures, which are considerably more primitive and rarely seamless. At the conference, Java creator James Gosling suggested that the inclusion of a Java virtual machine, as well as network connectivity in some BD devices, will allow updates to Blu-ray Discs via the Internet, adding content such as additional subtitle languages and promotional features not included on the disc at pressing time. This Java version is called BD-J and is built on a profile of the Globally Executable MHP (GEM) standard; GEM is the worldwide version of the Multimedia Home Platform standard.

=== Player profiles ===
The BD-ROM specification defines four Blu-ray Disc player profiles, including an audio-only player profile (BD-Audio) that does not require video decoding or BD-J. All of the video-based player profiles (BD-Video) are required to have a full implementation of BD-J.

Feature	BD-Audio	BD-Video			
Feature	BD-Audio	Grace Period (Note: Also known as Initial Standard profile.)	Bonus View	BD-Live (Note: Also known as Final Standard profile.)	Blu-ray 3D
Feature	Profile 3.0 (Note: Profile 3.0 is a separate audio-only player profile. The first Blu-ray Disc album to be released was Divertimenti by record label Lindberg Lyd.)	Profile 1.0	Profile 1.1	Profile 2.0	Profile 5.0
Built-in persistent memory	Unneeded	64 KB	64 KB	64 KB	64 KB?
Local storage capability (Note: This is used for storing audio/video and title updates. It can either be built-in memory or removable media, such as a memory card or USB flash memory.)	Unneeded	Optional	256 MB	1 GB	1 GB
Secondary video decoder (PiP)	No video	Optional	Mandatory	Mandatory	Mandatory
Secondary audio decoder (Note: A secondary audio decoder is typically used for interactive audio and commentary.)	Optional	Optional	Mandatory	Mandatory	Mandatory
Virtual file system	Unneeded	Optional	Mandatory	Mandatory	Mandatory
Internet connection capability	No	No	No	Mandatory	Mandatory

On November 2, 2007, the Grace Period Profile was superseded by Bonus View as the minimum profile for new BD-Video players released to the market. When Blu-ray Disc software not authored with interactive features dependent on Bonus View or BD-Live hardware capabilities is played on Profile 1.0 players, it is able to play the main feature of the disc, but some extra features may not be available or will have limited capability.

==== BD-Live ====
The biggest difference between Bonus View and BD-Live is that BD-Live requires the Blu-ray Disc player to have an Internet connection to access Internet-based content. BD-Live features have included Internet chats, scheduled chats with the director, Internet games, downloadable featurettes, downloadable quizzes, and downloadable movie trailers. While some Bonus View players may have an Ethernet port, it is used for firmware updates and is not used for Internet-based content. In addition, Profile 2.0 also requires more local storage in order to handle this content.

Profile 1.0 players are not eligible for Bonus View or BD-Live compliant upgrades and do not have the function or capability to access these upgrades, with the exception of the latest players and the PlayStation 3. Internet is required to use.

=== Region codes ===
Regions for the Blu-ray Disc standard: Region A/1 Region B/2 Region C/3

As with the implementation of region codes for DVDs, Blu-ray disc players sold in a specific geographical region are designed to play only discs authorized by the content provider for that region. This is intended to permit content providers (motion picture studios, television production companies, etc.) to enact regional price discrimination and/or exclusive content licensing. According to the Blu-ray Disc Association, all Blu-ray disc players and Blu-ray disc-equipped computer systems are required to enforce regional coding. However, content providers need not use region playback codes. Some current estimates suggest 70% of available movie Blu-ray discs from the major studios are region-free and can therefore be played on any Blu-ray disc player in any region.

Movie distributors have different region-coding policies. Among major American studios, Walt Disney Pictures, Warner Bros., Paramount Pictures, Universal Studios, and Sony Pictures have released most of their titles free of region-coding. (Note: Although titles released by Warner's New Line Cinema division were initially region-coded, subsequent re-releases have been region-free. Titles released by other labels on behalf of New Line are still subject to region-coding.) Universal and Warner Bros. nearly always make their Blu-rays region free while Universal's STXfilms Blu-rays are more often region locked as well as a few European Blu-rays. Paramount, though more occasionally region locking their Blu-rays, never uses Region A, B and C logos on their domestic releases. Fox and Sony more frequently region lock their Blu-rays and use A, B and C logos unlike Paramount, WB and Universal; domestic releases from both Fox and Sony are Region A locked while international releases of the same titles would be region free. MGM and Lionsgate have released a mix of region-free and region-coded titles. While 20th Century Fox initially released most of their titles region-coded, most of their post-Disney merger content is region-free. Vintage film restoration and distribution company The Criterion Collection uses US region-coding in all Blu-ray releases, with their releases in the UK market using UK region-coding.

The Blu-ray Disc region-coding scheme divides the world into three regions, labeled A, B, and C.

Region	Area
A	Americas, Hong Kong, Japan, North Korea, South Korea, Macau, Singapore, Taiwan, Oceania (excluding Australia and New Zealand), Southeast Asia.
B	Africa, Middle East, Southwest Asia, most of Europe (excluding Belarus, Russia, Ukraine, Moldova), Australia, New Zealand.
C	Central Asia, China, Mongolia, Indian subcontinent, Belarus, Russia, Ukraine, Kazakhstan, Moldova.
FREE	Informal term meaning "worldwide". Region free is not an official setting; discs that bear the region FREE symbol either have no flags set or have all three flags set. Discs with no flags set may not play in some non-compliant players.
A/B/C	Informal term meaning "worldwide". Region free is not an official setting; discs that bear the region FREE symbol either have no flags set or have all three flags set. Discs with no flags set may not play in some non-compliant players.

A new form of Blu-ray region-coding tests not only the region of the player/player software, but also its country code, repurposing a user setting intended for localization (PSR19) as a new form of regional lockout. This means, for example, while both the US and Japan are Region A, some American discs will not play on devices/software configured for Japan or vice versa, since the two countries have different country codes. (For example, the United States is "US" (21843 or hex 0x5553), Japan is "JP" (19024 or hex 0x4a50), and Canada is "CA" (17217 or hex 0x4341).) Although there are only three Blu-ray regions, the country code allows much more precise control of the regional distribution of Blu-ray discs than the six (or eight) DVD regions. With Blu-ray discs, there are no "special regions" such as the regions 7 and 8 for DVDs.

In circumvention of region-coding restrictions, stand-alone Blu-ray disc players are sometimes modified by third parties to allow for playback of Blu-ray discs (and DVDs) with any region code. Instructions ("hacks") describing how to reset the Blu-ray region counter of computer player applications to make them multi-region indefinitely are also regularly posted to video enthusiast websites and forums. Unlike DVD region codes, Blu-ray region codes are verified only by the player software, not by the optical drive's firmware.

As of 2017 the latest types of Blu-ray players, suitable for Ultra HD Blu-ray content, are not region-free, but Ultra HD Blu-ray disc manufacturers have not yet locked the discs to any region and they work worldwide.

=== Digital rights management ===
The Blu-ray Disc format employs several layers of digital rights management (DRM) which restrict the usage of the discs. This has led to extensive criticism of the format by organizations opposed to DRM, such as the Free Software Foundation, and consumers because new releases require player firmware updates to allow disc playback.

==== High-bandwidth Digital Content Protection ====
Blu-ray equipment is required to implement the High-bandwidth Digital Content Protection (HDCP) system to encrypt the data sent by players to rendering devices through physical connections. This is aimed at preventing the copying of copyrighted content as it travels across cables. Through a protocol flag in the media stream called the Image Constraint Token (ICT), a Blu-ray Disc can enforce its reproduction in a lower resolution whenever a full HDCP-compliant link is not used. In order to ease the transition to high definition formats, the adoption of this protection method was postponed until 2011.

==== Advanced Access Content System ====
The AACS decryption process

The Advanced Access Content System (AACS) is a standard for content distribution and digital rights management. It was developed by AACS Licensing Administrator, LLC (AACS LA), a consortium that includes Disney, Intel, Microsoft, Panasonic, Warner Bros., IBM, Toshiba, and Sony. Since the appearance of the format on devices in 2006, several successful attacks have been made on it. The first known attack relied on the trusted client problem. In addition, decryption keys have been extracted from a weakly protected player (WinDVD). Since keys can be revoked in newer releases, this is only a temporary attack, and new keys must continually be discovered in order to decrypt the latest discs.

==== BD+ ====
BD+ was developed by Cryptography Research Inc. and is based on their concept of Self-Protecting Digital Content. BD+, effectively a small virtual machine embedded in authorized players, allows content providers to include executable programs on Blu-ray Discs. Such programs can:

- Examine the host environment to see if the player has been tampered with. Every licensed playback device manufacturer must provide the BD+ licensing authority with memory footprints that identify their devices.
- Verify that the player's keys have not been changed
- Execute native code, possibly to patch an otherwise insecure system
- Transform the audio and video output. Parts of the content will not be viewable without letting the BD+ program unscramble it.

If a playback device manufacturer finds that its devices have been hacked, it can potentially release BD+ code that detects and circumvents the vulnerability. These programs can then be included in all new content releases. The specifications of the BD+ virtual machine are available only to licensed device manufacturers. A list of licensed commercial adopters is available from the BD+ website.

The first titles using BD+ were released in October 2007. Since November 2007, versions of BD+ protection have been circumvented by various versions of the AnyDVD HD program. Other programs known to be capable of circumventing BD+ protection are DumpHD (versions 0.6 and above, along with some supporting software), MakeMKV, and two applications from DVDFab (Passkey and HD Decrypter).

==== BD-ROM Mark ====
ROM Mark is a small amount of cryptographic data that is stored separately from normal Blu-ray Disc data, aiming to prevent replication of the discs. The cryptographic data is needed to decrypt the copyrighted disc content protected by AACS. A specially licensed piece of hardware is required to insert the ROM Mark into the media during mastering. During replication, this ROM Mark is transferred together with the recorded data to the disc. In consequence, any copies of a disc made with a regular recorder will lack the ROM Mark data and will be unreadable on standard players.

== Backward compatibility ==
The Blu-ray Disc Association recommends but does not require that Blu-ray Disc drives be capable of reading standard DVDs and CDs, for backward compatibility. Most Blu-ray Disc players are capable of reading both CDs and DVDs; however, a few of the early Blu-ray Disc players released in 2006, such as the Sony BDP-S1, could play DVDs but not CDs. In addition, with the exception of some early models from LG and Samsung, Blu-ray players cannot play HD DVDs, and HD DVD players cannot play Blu-ray Discs. Some Blu-ray players can also play Video CDs, Super Audio CDs, and/or DVD-Audio discs. All Ultra HD Blu-ray players can play regular Blu-ray Discs, and most can play DVDs and CDs. The PlayStation 4 and PlayStation 5 do not support CDs.

== Variations ==
=== High Fidelity Pure Audio (BD-A) ===
High Fidelity Pure Audio (HFPA) is a marketing initiative, spearheaded by the Universal Music Group, for audio-only Blu-ray optical discs. Launched in 2013 as a potential successor to the compact disc, it has been compared with DVD-A and SACD, which had similar aims.

=== AVCHD ===
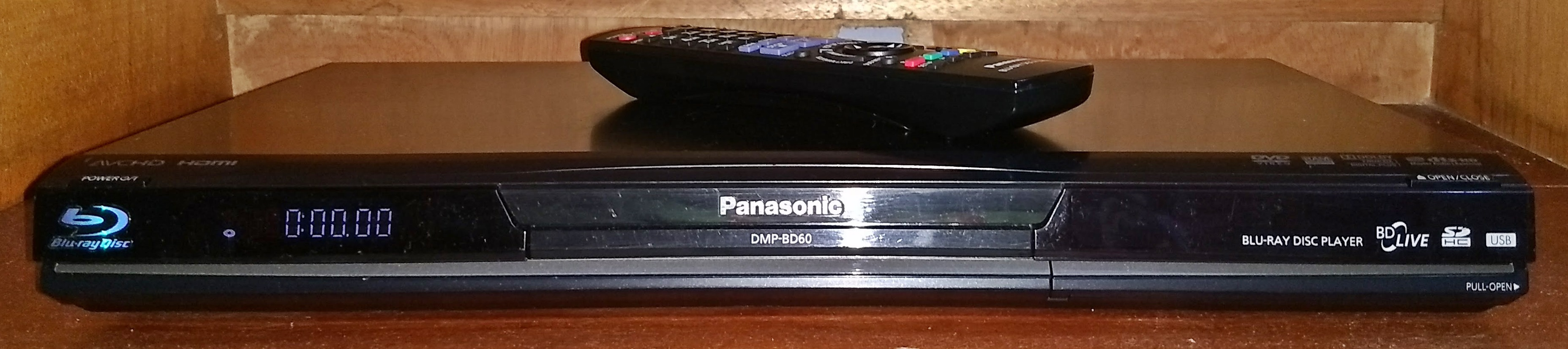
A Panasonic Blu-ray player DMP-BD60 (late 2009) compatible with AVCHD

AVCHD was originally developed as a high-definition format for consumer tapeless camcorders. Derived from the Blu-ray Disc specification, AVCHD shares a similar random access directory structure but is restricted to lower audio and video bitrates, simpler interactivity, and the use of AVC-video and Dolby AC-3 (or linear PCM) audio. Being primarily an acquisition format, AVCHD playback is not universally recognized among devices that play Blu-ray Discs. Nevertheless, many such devices are capable of playing AVCHD recordings from removable media, such as DVDs, SD/SDHC memory cards, "Memory Stick" cards, and hard disk drives.

=== AVCREC ===
AVCREC uses a BDAV container to record high-definition content on conventional DVDs. Presently AVCREC is tightly integrated with the Japanese ISDB broadcast standard and is not marketed outside of Japan. AVCREC is used primarily in set-top digital video recorders and in this regard it is comparable to HD REC.

=== Blu-ray 3D ===
The Blu-ray 3D logo

The Blu-ray Disc Association (BDA) created a task force made up of executives from the film industry and the consumer electronics and IT sectors to help define standards for putting 3D film and 3D television content on a Blu-ray Disc. On December 17, 2009, the BDA officially announced 3D specs for Blu-ray Disc, allowing backward compatibility with current 2D Blu-ray players. The BDA has said, "The Blu-ray 3D specification calls for encoding 3D video using the "Stereo High" profile defined by Multiview Video Coding (MVC), an extension to the ITU-T H.264 Advanced Video Coding (AVC) codec currently implemented by all Blu-ray Disc players. MPEG4-MVC compresses both left and right eye views with a typical 50% overhead compared to equivalent 2D content, and can provide full 1080p resolution backward compatibility with current 2D Blu-ray Disc players." This means the MVC (3D) stream is backward compatible with H.264/AVC (2D) stream, allowing older 2D devices and software to decode stereoscopic video streams, ignoring additional information for the second view. However, some 3D discs have a user limitation set preventing the disc from being viewed in 2D (though a 2D disc is often included in the packaging).

Sony added Blu-ray 3D support to its PlayStation 3 console via a firmware upgrade on September 21, 2010. The console had previously gained 3D gaming capability via an update on April 21, 2010. Since the version 3.70 software update on August 9, 2011, the PlayStation 3 can play DTS-HD Master Audio and DTS-HD High Resolution Audio while playing 3D Blu-ray. Dolby TrueHD is used on a small minority of Blu-ray 3D releases, and bitstreaming implemented in slim PlayStation 3 models only (original "fat" PS3 models decode internally and send audio as LPCM). The PlayStation VR can also be used to watch these movies in 3D on a PlayStation 4. As of 2018, most major home entertainment studios, such as Walt Disney Studios, Sony Pictures, MGM, Universal Pictures, and Warner Archive Collection had discontinued the Blu-ray 3D format in North America, but continued to produce and sell them in other regions such as South America, Europe, Asia, and Australia. Paramount Pictures has ceased sales and productions of 3D Blu-ray Discs all over the world, its last 3D releases being Ghost in the Shell and Transformers: The Last Knight, while Warner Bros. continued to sell and produce 3D Blu-ray Discs in North America until 2022 with their last film released on the format being Dune. Kino Lorber (in occasional conjunction with Warner Archive Collection) still sometimes releases digitally restored 3D Blu-ray versions of films from the classic 3D era, often under license from other studios. The German boutique label Turbine Media released several recent Paramount Pictures and Universal Pictures films on Blu-ray 3D. Turbine also released Blu-ray 3D versions of F9: The Fast Saga and Fast X, which were never released in 3D in North America. Most Blu-ray 3D releases by Turbine feature Dolby Atmos sound, and are all region-free. In Japan, Marvel Cinematic Universe films continue to release on Blu-ray 3D by Happinet to 2025.

In 2023, a remastered version of Avatar and its sequel were both released on Blu-ray 3D. These were Disney's first two 3D releases in North America since 2017. Furthermore, a Blu-ray 3D release of Avatar: Fire and Ash was also released in May of 2026 for North America, marking the studio’s final Blu-ray 3D release in that region since 2023.

=== Ultra HD Blu-ray ===
Ultra HD Blu-ray Discs are incompatible with existing standard Blu-ray players. They support 4K UHD (3840 × 2160 pixel resolution) video at frame rates up to 60 progressive frames per second, encoded using High Efficiency Video Coding. The discs support both high dynamic range (HDR) by increasing the color depth to 10-bit per color and a greater color gamut than supported by conventional Blu-ray video by using the Rec. 2020 color space.

The specification for an 8K Blu-ray format was also completed by the Blu-ray Disc Association for use in Japan. More than two hours of 8K content can be recorded on BDXL discs.

== See also ==
- 2D plus Delta
- Blu-ray Disc authoring
- Blu-ray Disc recordable
- Comparison of high-definition optical disc formats
- Comparison of popular optical data-storage systems
- Comparison of video player software: Optical media ability, for a list of software BD video players
- Digital 3D and 3D television
- Disk-drive performance characteristics
- Format war
- High-definition optical disc format war
- High-definition television
- Holographic Versatile Disc (HVD)
- HD NVD
- List of optical disc manufacturers
- List of Blu-ray player manufacturers
- SD Blu-ray
- Universal Media Disc
- Versatile Multilayer Disc
