= Pioneer BDR-101A =

The Pioneer BDR-101A was the world's first PC compatible Blu-ray Disc recorder. It utilized an ATAPI connection and complied with the then latest specifications for BD-R (Blu-ray Disc recordable), BD-RE (Blu-ray Disc rewritable) and BD-ROM (Blu-ray Disc read-only memory). The drive began shipping on May 17, 2006. It supports a data transfer rate of 72 Mbit/s (2x) for both reading and writing making it possible to record over two hours of a high-definition (HD) video (at 24 Mbit/s transfer rate) on a single disc. The drive was available only in beige. As of August 2006, the retail price was around US$1,000.

The drive was limited in that it supported neither Compact disc nor dual layer BD.
