= Sony BDP-S1 =

First generation Blu-ray Disc player

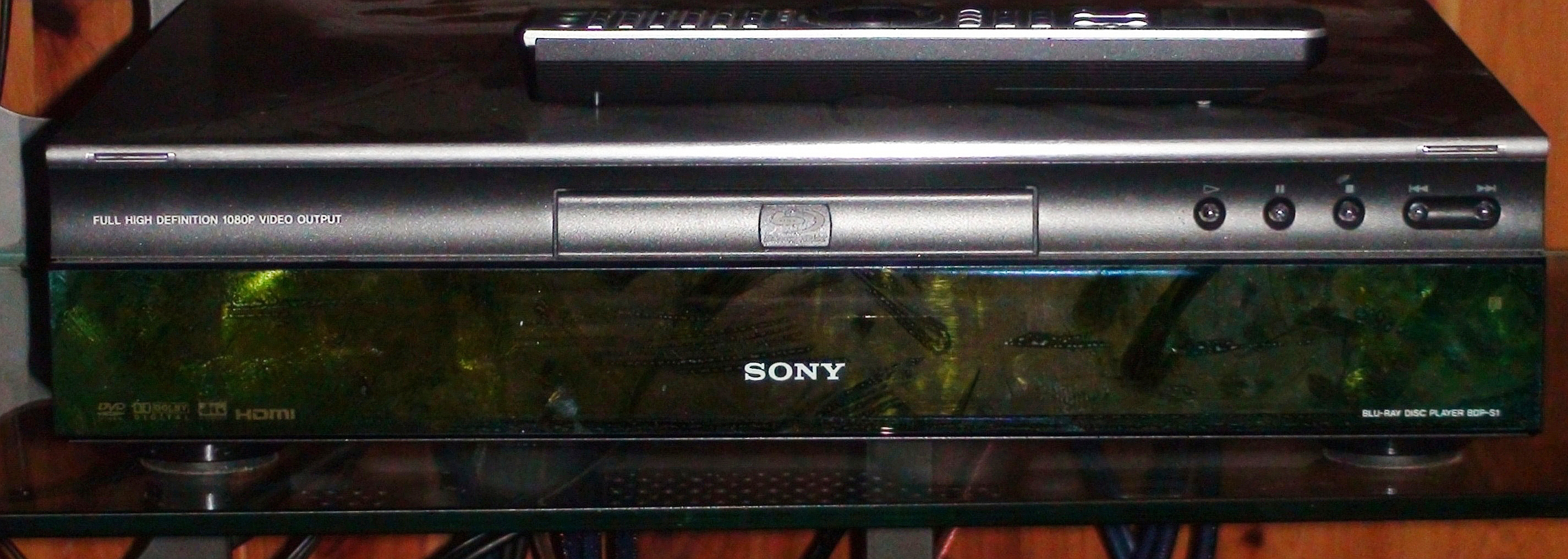
A Sony BDP-S1 and its remote controller on an entertainment center shelf

The Sony BDP-S1 is a first generation Blu-ray Disc (BD) player and is the first such player released in North America. It was originally scheduled for release in the United States on August 18, 2006 with a MSRP of $999.95. Sony had postponed the release date of this player several times and it was released on December 4, 2006.

On November 30, 2006 Sony announced that the player began shipping to major consumer electronics retailers and specialty dealers nationwide. It became available at retailers on December 2, 2006. The player has received firmware updates since its release, the most recent one being released in 2012.

== Overview ==
=== Network capabilities ===
The Sony BDP-S1 does not come with a built-in Ethernet or Wi-Fi connection; therefore it has no online capabilities. However, firmware upgrades may be applied by downloading the upgrade and burning them onto a recordable or rewritable DVD and loading it on the player for installation. As of December 2020, the latest firmware release for the BDP-S1 is version 6.10, which was released on April 11, 2012. The update improves BD-Java compatibility to enhance interactivity with some BD-ROMs, adds compatibility with BD-R/RE discs burned by the Click to Disc™ and Click to Disc™ Editor software included with some VAIO® computers, adds Dolby® TrueHD and Dolby Digital Plus Audio decoding functionality, enhanced playback compatibility with certain BD-ROM format discs, enhanced customer support capability, compatibility with the BD-R/RE format (BDMV), and corrects the output signal status information for audio output and display when Linear PCM 5.1 channel soundtracks are played via HDMI.

=== BD-J compatibility ===
During its initial release, there were reported issues with certain BD-ROM movie discs, namely BD-J functionality. The discs played incorrectly or would not play at all. Sony resolved this issue with a firmware update and the player is now compatible with all BD-J (Blu-Ray Disc Java) standard discs once upgraded to it.

=== Audio decoding capability ===
The player is capable of decoding Dolby Digital, Dolby Digital Plus, (Note: After firmware upgrade v2.00 or higher.) Dolby TrueHD, LPCM, and DTS core. Currently, the player is not capable of decoding DTS-HD High Resolution Audio or DTS-HD Master Audio.

=== Audio and video output ===
Audio is sent out of the player through TOSLINK, HDMI, or composite 5.1 analog surround sound jacks. The player will gives the option to output Dolby Digital or DTS via the Toslink (optical or coax), or selectively downmix either independently to PCM. However the digital output is not necessarily compatible with other surround system decoders. Even standard DVD soundtracks cannot be guaranteed to be correctly decoded by Toslink input equipped decoders. There is a disclaimer in the supplied owners manual to this effect. The player will save the user's selections allowing for customization of your outputs. The supplied HDMI connection is version 1.2 and does not support Deep Color or Bitstream out for Dolby Digital Plus, Dolby TrueHD, DTS-HD and DTS-HD Master Audio. This feature is not capable of being added later.

The BDP-S1's analog composite and component video outputs differentiate it from most Blu-ray Disc players manufactured since the early 2010s, as all Blu-ray Disc players manufactured after 2013 no longer come equipped with analog composite and or component video outputs in order to deter video piracy.

=== Load times ===
The BDP-S1, being one of the earliest of the first generation Blu-ray Disc players, has much longer load times than later model BD players, around two to three minutes from the initial system power up to actual video playback. When the unit is fully powered up, playback is faster, taking approximately fifty to seventy seconds from disc insertion. However, this is not as fast as the PlayStation 3. Loading times are improved from the original version when updated to later firmware versions.

=== DVD-Audio, SACD, and Compact Disc playback ===
The player is not compatible with any audio disc format, as a BD-only drive is used. However, playback of Compact Discs (CD) is possible when using the Asia-Pacific version of the BDP-S1, known as the BDP-S1E. A re-branded derivative version of the BDP-S1E with CD playback capability was later released in North American region, with the model number, BDP-S2000ES.
