= Durabis =

Scratch resistant polymer coating by TDK used on blu-ray discs

Durabis (Latin for "you will last") is a brand name for a clear polymer coating developed by the TDK Corporation. It was unveiled at CES 2005 to remove the need for "cumbersome" protective cartridges to protect the media’s recording layer. The need for a protective polymer arose due to the data layer on Blu-ray discs being much closer to the surface of the disc than in other disc formats, such as HD DVD. One of its principal applications at first was for scratch resistance in Blu-ray and other optical discs. It is claimed to be tough enough to resist screwdriver damage and make scratched optical discs (CDs and DVDs) a "thing of the past".

To meet Blu-ray's specifications, TDK's coating had to be less than 0.1 mm thick, be hard enough to resist considerable damage, and be transparent enough to be easily read through. According to a filing with the U.S. Patent and Trademark Office, the process essentially spin-coats two layers onto discs. One is for protection against scratches, and the other protects against stains and oils.

While Blu-ray mandates the use of a scratch-resistant coating, it does not specify what coating is used, and both Sony and Panasonic have their own independent hard coating technologies that are primarily in use on Blu-ray pre-recorded discs.

A TDK spokesman says the present protective layer represents "the first generation" of the coating and that the company has been refining the technology to better suit Blu-ray Discs. Although it might seem possible to adapt the polymer to other uses in LCD, CRT, and plasma screens, TDK plans to target the DVD market for now, because scratches are so common on DVDs that in the rental market, they may only last about 12 to 13 rentals on average.
