= China Hualu Group =

Chinese electronics company

China Hualu Group Co., Ltd.
- Type: State-owned
- Industry: Audio and video electronics
- Founded: June 18, 2000; 26 years ago
- Headquarters: Dalian, Liaoning, China
- Area served: Worldwide
- Key people: Ou Li (欧黎) (chair, party secretary)
- Website: www.hualu.com.cn

China Hualu Group (Chinese: 中国华录集团) is a Chinese state-owned electronics manufacturer headquartered in Dalian, Liaoning. It was established in Dalian on June 17, 1992, by the joint capital of nine designated video recorder enterprises across the country. It was born for the purpose of building China's video recorder industry.

It had a net revenue in 2006 of US$659.8 million and was ranked No. 43 on a list of Chinese electronics companies sorted on this figure.

In 2021, the South China Morning Post described the company as "an important asset to Beijing".
