= Hitachi-LG Data Storage =

Manufacturer of DVD and Blu-ray optical disc drives

- Industry: Data storage, sensors
- Founded: 2000; 26 years ago
- Headquarters: Tokyo, Japan; Seoul, South Korea
- Key people: Makoto Hayata, President & CEO; Jae Wook Kang, President & CFO
- Products: Optical Disc Drives, LiDAR Sensor, Dust Sensor, AI Interactive Display, Wireless Charger, In-vehicle Air Purifier, Solid State Drive(SSD)
- Owner: Hitachi (51%); LG Electronics (49%)
- Website: hitachi-lg.com

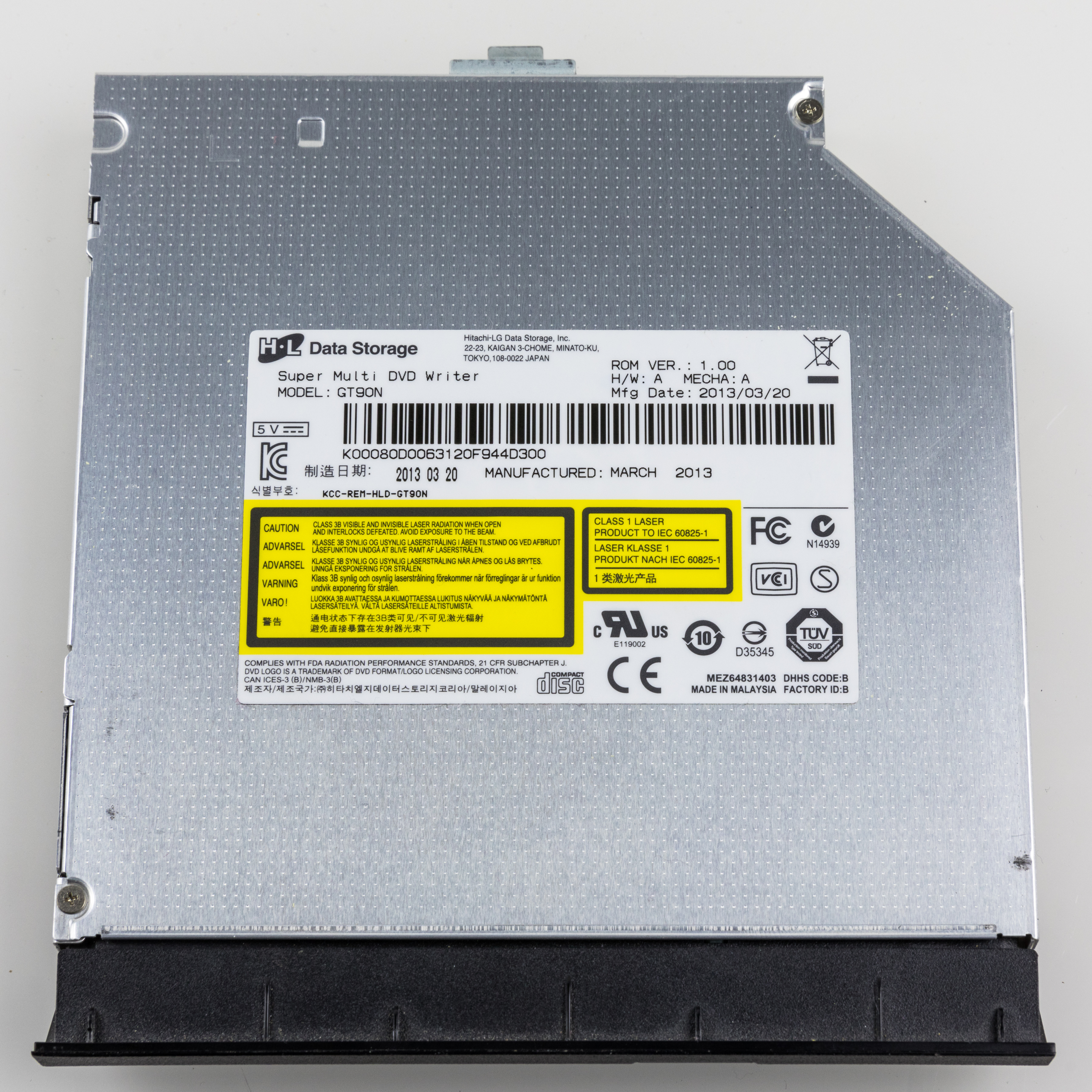
H-L Data Storage GT90N - DVD Writer

Hitachi-LG Data Storage (HLDS, HL-DT-ST or H-L Data Storage), a joint venture between Hitachi, Ltd. and LG Electronics, is a manufacturer of DVD and Blu-ray optical disc drives for desktop computers and laptops.

== History ==
Founded in late 2000, the company began operation in January 2001 and shipped its first product that summer.

In 2006, HLDS began developing Blu-ray Disc drives. The company claims that it has led the disk drive industry in market share since its founding, with a 20% share for fiscal year 2001, 29% for fiscal year 2012, and 60% for fiscal year 2016.

In 2011, Hitachi and LG pleaded guilty to price fixing, and were fined USD21.1M.
