= HD NVD =

HD NVD is a Chinese high definition standard created to compete with Blu-ray discs. The standard uses a red laser like the one used in DVD and CD players whereas Blu-ray uses blue laser. This standard allows Chinese companies to avoid paying royalties to foreign companies for the manufacture of Blu-ray products.
