= Imation =

Former data storage business

Imation Corporation
- Type: Public
- Traded as: NYSE: IMN (prior to 2017)
- Industry: Data storage
- Founded: March 1996; 30 years ago in Maplewood, Minnesota, U.S.
- Founder: 3M (as a spin-off)
- Headquarters: Oakdale, Minnesota
- Number of employees: 1,210 (2009)

Imation Corporation was an American company which manufactured and marketed data storage products. It was founded in 1996 as a spin-off of 3M's data storage and imaging business. Imation had three core elements: traditional storage (magnetic tape and optical products), secure and scalable storage (data backup, data archive and data security for small and medium businesses) and what the company calls "audio and video information" products.

In January 2017, the company announced a change of name and direction, completing its move away from the data storage business towards being focused on asset management and strategic investment and rebranding itself as GlassBridge Enterprises.

The Imation brand was sold off later that year to O-Jin Corporation Co., a Korean company who have since licensed its use to other businesses, but retain ownership of it as of 2024.

== History ==
=== As 3M ===
Originally part of 3M, the company was involved in the development of many technological improvements in data storage, such as the introduction of the first American-made magnetic tape in 1947, the first quarter-inch tape cartridge for data storage (QIC) in 1971, and the 3.5-inch (89 mm) floppy disk in 1984.

=== As Imation ===
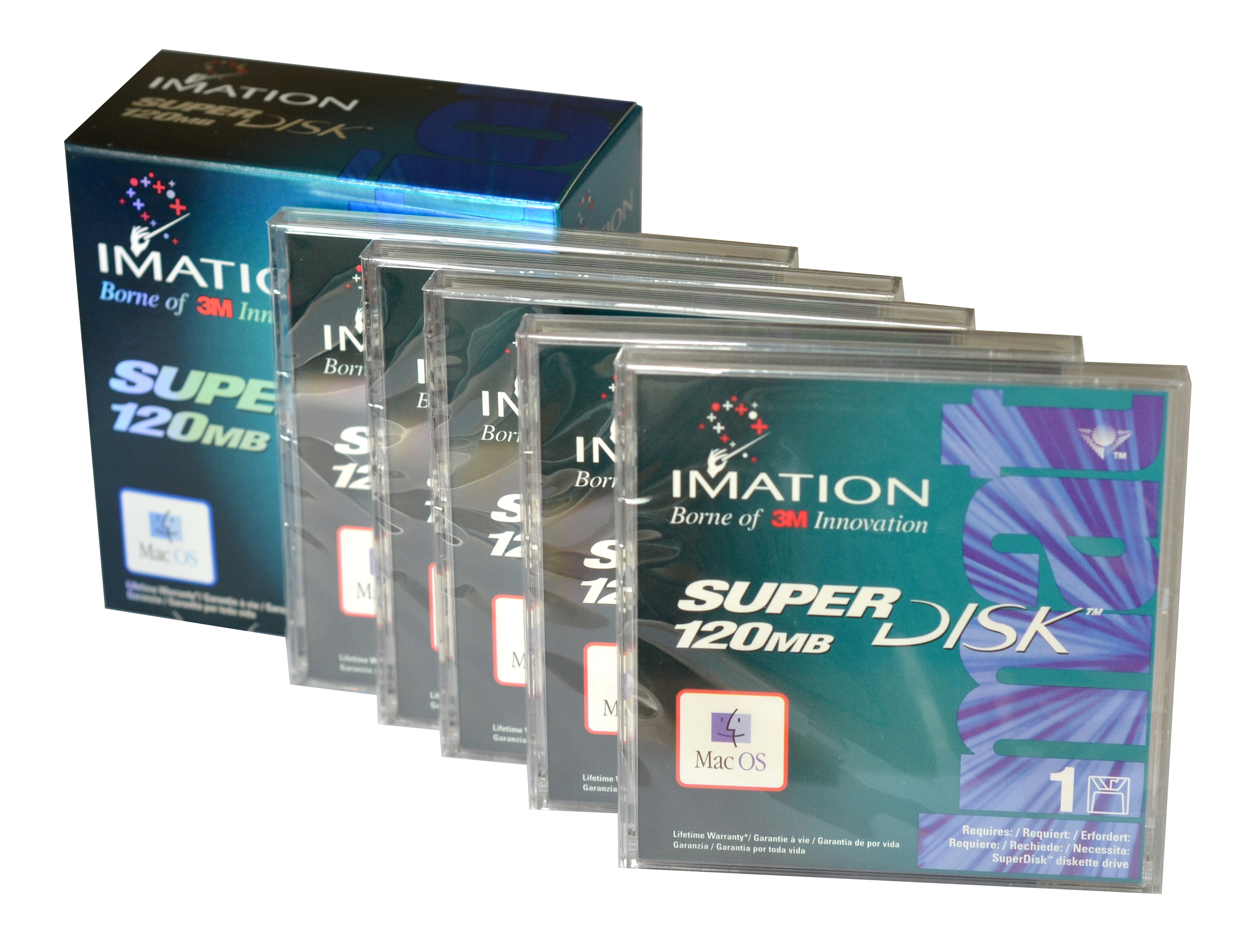
Imation SuperDisks

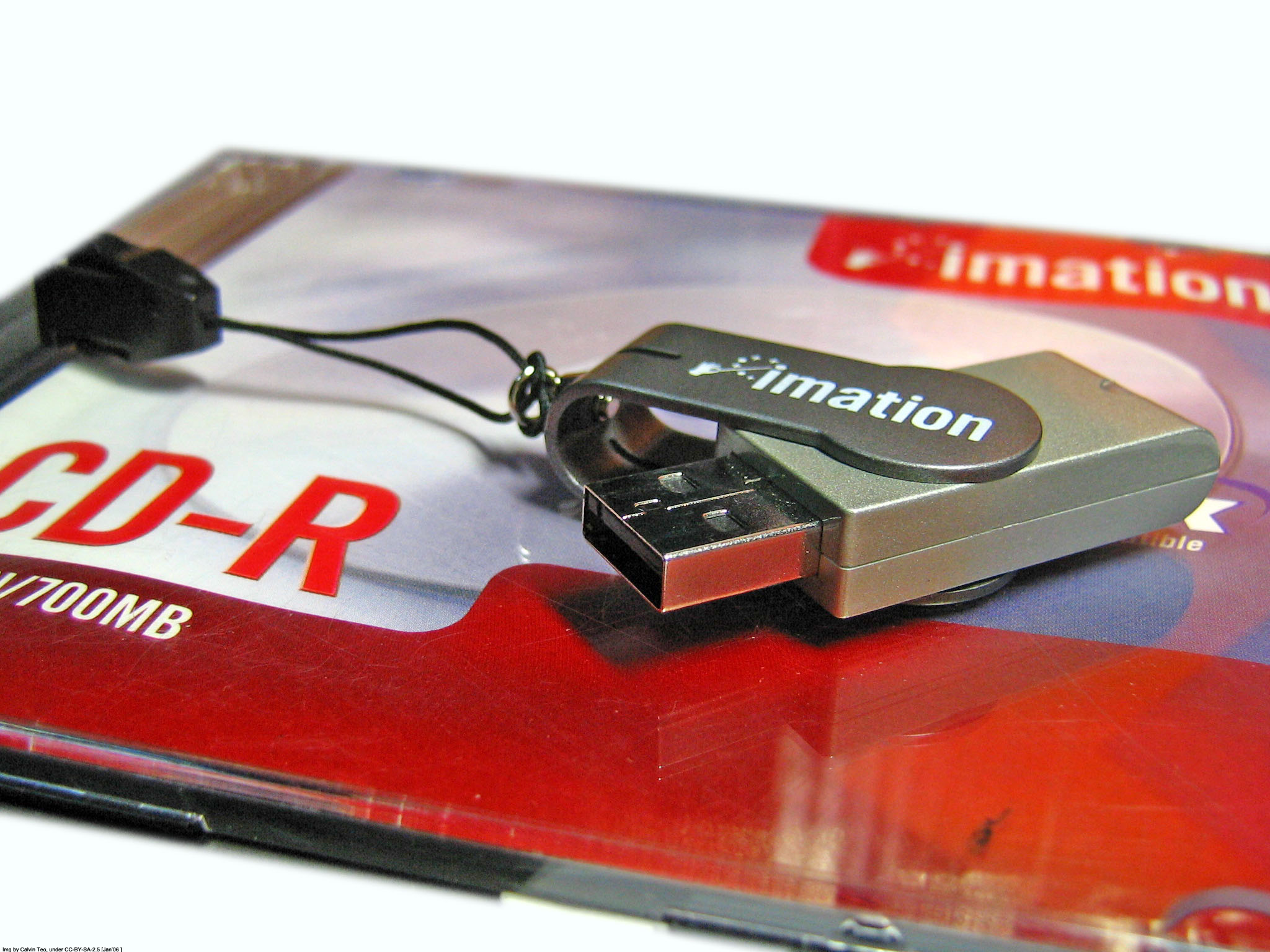
A USB memory stick and a CD-R by Imation

Imation was started in 1996, when 3M spun off its data storage and imaging business. The company underwent a divestment of non-core businesses, and invested in four core product technology areas: secure storage, scalable storage, wireless/connectivity, and magnetic tape.

In late 2007, Imation acquired TDK's recording media business, including flash media, optical media, magnetic tape, and accessories, for $300 million. This also included a license to use the "TDK Life on Record" brand on data storage and audio products for 25 years. In September 2015, Imation announced that it had agreed to relinquish this license and would cease selling TDK-branded products by the end of the year.

In February 2012, Imation announced a product set to secure mobile data, identities, and workspaces, based on the idea that employees used portable storage devices to transport corporate data.

The security news followed five acquisitions the company made in 2011 in scalable storage and data security: ENCRYPTX; MXI Security from Memory Experts International; the assets of ProStor; the secure data storage hardware business of IronKey; and intellectual property from Nine Technologies. Imation received an exclusive license from IronKey for its secure storage management software and service and a license to use the IronKey brand for secure storage products.

In October 2011, Imation products for small and medium businesses centered on its DataGuard and InfiniVault multi-tier data protection and data archive appliances.

The company sold consumer electronics, headphones and accessories under the Imation, Memorex, TDK Life on Record, and XtremeMac brands. The combined Imation, Memorex and TDK Life on Record brands made the company into a global market share leader in sales of CD-R and DVD media before that business was shut down in 2016.

=== Change of name and direction ===
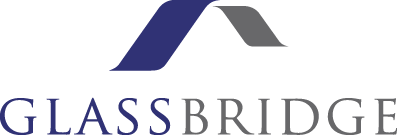

In January 2017, Imation announced its intention to change its name to GlassBridge Enterprises, completing its change of direction away from the data storage business towards being an asset management and strategic investment company. The name change became effective on February 21, 2017.

Net revenue for 2016 was $44.1 million, compared to $529.2 million the year before.

GlassBridge's stock registration was revoked effective January 30, 2026, due to GlassBridge's failure to file periodic reports with the United States Securities and Exchange Commission, after filing a form 10-Q with the SEC for the period ending on September 30, 2023.

=== Sale of Imation brand ===
GlassBridge Enterprises sold the Imation brand name to Korean company O-Jin Corporation Co., Ltd. (now Ojin Corporation Co.) on August 4, 2017.

In 2019 Imation, by then under O-Jin's ownership, announced licensing deals for use of the brand by PNY Technology, Ritek Corporation and photo printer company Prinics.

As of July 2024 O-Jin still owns the Imation brand.

== See also ==
- 3M
- Computer data storage
- Memorex
