= Ritek =

Taiwanese manufacturer

Coordinates: 24°52′17″N 121°1′13″E

RITEK Corporation
- Type: Public
- Industry: Computer hardware Computer data storage Green product
- Founded: 29 December 1988; 37 years ago
- Headquarters: Hsinchu Industrial Park, Taiwan
- Key people: Founder:Jintai Yeh; Chairman:Gorden Yeh; Vice President:Jennifer Yang
- Products: Optical storage; Flash memory; OLED; ITO glass; Nanotechnology
- Revenue: ▲550 million USD (2016)
- Number of employees: 5,900, 3,000 (Taiwan)
- Subsidiaries: RITEK Foundation; PVNEXT Corporation; AIMCORE Corporation; U-TECH Corporation (Public); UCHAIN Logistics. Co., Ltd.; Prorit Corporation; RiTdisplay Corporation; RiteDia Corporation; CASHIDO Corporation; RitFast Corporation; Kunshan Zhonglai Electronic Technology Co., Ltd.; Hutek Corporation; Advance Media Inc.; Conrexx Technology; Ritrax Corp. Ltd.
- Website: www.ritek.com

RITEK Corporation is a Taiwanese company that manufactures optical discs such as compact discs (CDs), DVDs, and Blu-ray, as well as storage cards such as CompactFlash cards, SD cards and MultiMediaCards, flash drives. Ritek also produces solar modules and touch panel products such as passive-matrix OLED and ITO glass. Ritek has also launched some products in nano- and biotechnology.

Ritek Corporation was established in 1988 with the goal of manufacturing CDs in Taiwan. In 1990 the company produced the first CD in Taiwan. In November 2005, the company had a market share of 20 percent in rewritable DVDs and CD-RWs and was the biggest disc-manufacturer worldwide. As of 2020, Ritek has 5,900 employees.

== Locations ==
- Hsinchu, Taiwan (headquarters)
- Chungli, Taiwan
- Yangzhou, China
- Kunshan, China
- Ho Chi Minh City, Vietnam
- Cheongwon County, South Korea
- Ridderkerk, Netherlands
- Los Angeles, United States

== History ==
In 1952, Yeh Ching-Tai created Min Li Plastics (明理塑膠工廠). The factory produced plastic cigarette boxes and polyethylene milk bottles. During that period, he purchased a second-hand electroplating tool from Japan, with the original intention of plating chromium on plastics to enhance durability; this did not work. He then moved to electroplate copper and nickel on the stampers of vinyl records, entering the record business. Yeh Ching-Tai established First Vintage Record and Platinum Studio. He set up vinyl record production facilities in Sanchungpu in 1960. As part of the business for First Vintage Record, he took singer Sally Yeh to perform and market albums throughout department stores. Mr. Yeh Ching-Tai also introduced the recording technology from Japan to establish Platinum Studio.

In 1980, Yeh imported from Switzerland 24-track recorders and invited a technician from Japan for instructions. At that time, he mentioned that digitalization was the trend for the record industry. Japan was already trial producing compact disks. To ensure time to market, Mr. Yeh Ching-Tai recruited a group of engineers from the Industrial Technology Research Institute in 1985 to manufacture compact disks. They started with simple plastic pressing to accumulate technological expertise.

In 1988, Yeh founded RITEK Corporation. The company's English name is a portmanteau of the words "right" and "technology".

In May 1990, the company manufactured the first compact disk in Taiwan with support from the Mechanical and Systems Research Laboratories, Industrial Technology Research Institute. The company became a formal member of the IFPI Members Foundation in Taiwan in 1991. The company set up facilities for the production of compact discs in Australia in 1994.

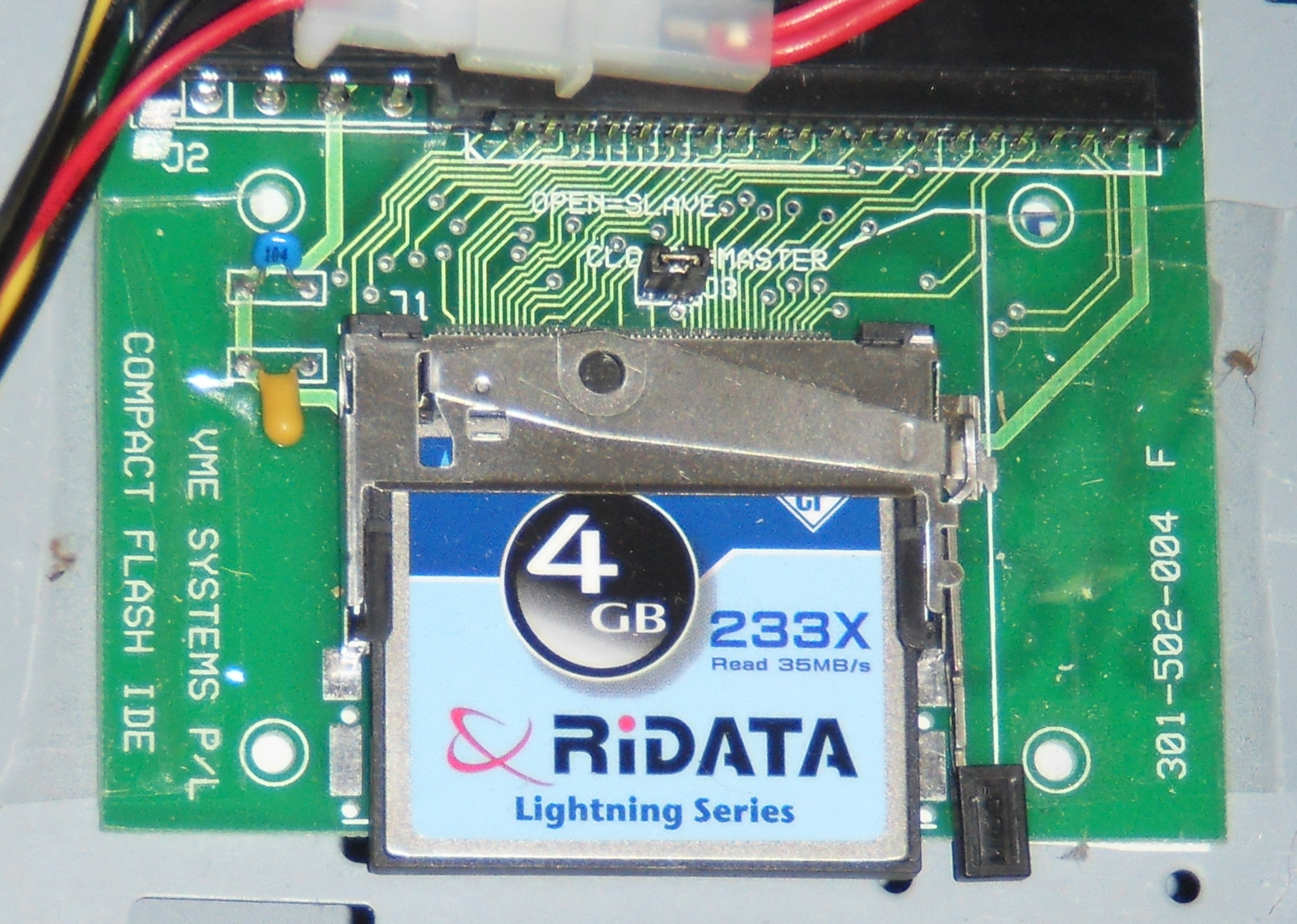
4 GB CompactFlash card from RiDATA

In 1996, Ritek Corporation had its IPO in Taiwan. The company created the Compact Disk Manufacturers Association (CMA), aiming to protect copyright for CD replication. The company set up facilities for the production of CDs in the United States, and manufactured the first CD-RW and the first DVD in Taiwan. The company manufactured the first DVD-R in Taiwan in 1997. Also in 1997, Ritek signed a copyright verification agreement with the Taiwan offices of the Music Publishers Association and became the first CD manufacturer in Taiwan to obtain ISO 9001 certification. The company also set up facilities for the production of CDs in the United Kingdom.

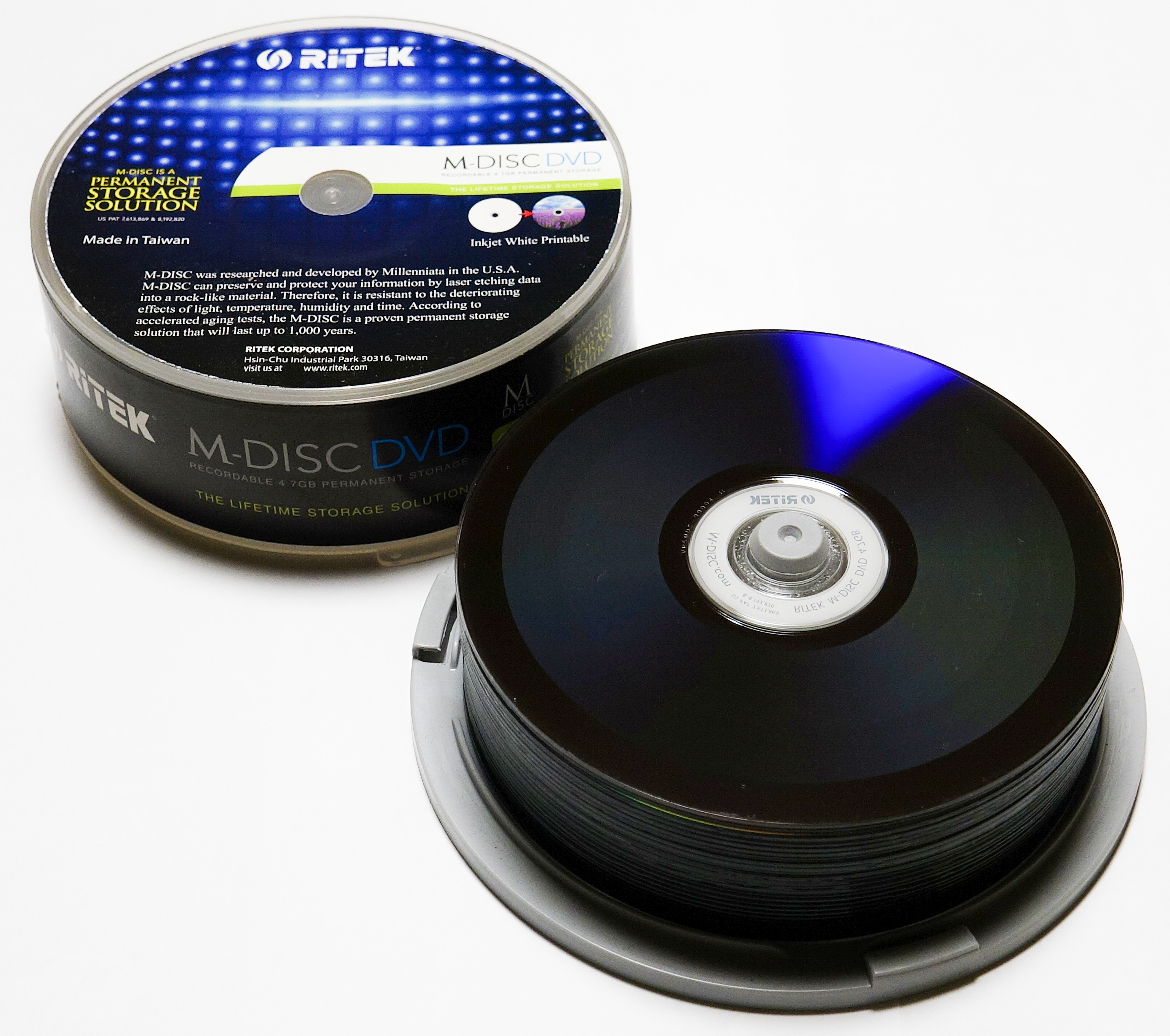
Ritek M-DISC-DVDs

In 1998, Ritek manufactured the first DVD-RAM in Taiwan. In 1999, U-TECH Media Corporation was formed as the largest pre-recorded medium manufacturer in Taiwan. Ritek Foundation was established. Ritek became the first CD maker in Taiwan that obtained the ISO 14001 certification, and in 2000 it became the first Taiwanese CD maker to obtain QS9000 certification., and Ritek's MiniDisc won a Taiwan Excellence Award. In November 2006, Ritek became the exclusive producer of Maxell CD-Rs and DVDs. In 2008, Ritek's USB flash drive received a product design award from iF International Forum Design. In 2013, Ritek launched M-DISC DVD and Blu-ray. In 2017, RiData OTG Flash Drive won the Gold Award for Technology Trends by PC HOME and PC ADV 3C. Ritek entered into a licensing agreement with Imation in 2019.

=== OLED ===
In 1999 the company manufactured the first OLED in Taiwan. In 2001, the company built fully automated OLED mass production lines and RiTdisplay Corporation was established as OLED manufacturer in Taiwan. In 2015, Ritek started to manufacture passive-matrix OLED wearables.

=== Solar energy ===
In 2008, Ritek entered into a strategic alliance with Scheuten, a solar energy company in Europe. PV Next, a thin-film solar manufacturer dedicated to (copper indium gallium selenide), was established in 2009. In 2011, Ritek Solar worked with SolarEdge and showcased new IM series solar modules at the Intersolar Europe conference in Munich. Ritek's solar module won the Taiwan Excellent PV Award from the Bureau of Energy, Ministry of Economic Affairs, R.O.C (Taiwan) in 2016.

=== International activities ===
In 1999, The company set up with Philips joint venture facilities for the manufacturing of CD-R in Germany (PrimeDisc Technologies in Wiesbaden). In 2003, RME was set up in Germany as a printing and packaging plant for compact discs. In 2004, Ritek's Japanese subsidiary, Ritek Japan, was established. In 2007, Ritek's North Africa subsidiary, Ritek North Africa, was established. In 2018, Ritek became Japan Panasonic's only overseas Archival Disc (AD) production partner. In 2016, Ritek collaborated with Japan's largest chain elderly daycare center to found Ricare Day Service Center.

== Equity investments ==
- AimCore Technology Co., Ltd. – ITO glass, established 2007
- U-TECH Media Corporation – pre-recorded compact disks
- U-Chain – warehousing and logistics
- RiTdisplay Corporation – passive-matrix OLED
- RiteDia – diamond-like carbon coating
- RitFast Corporation – touch panels
- CASHIDO – nanotechnology
- PRORIT Corporation – high-precision plastic injection
- RitPower – solar modules

Brands

- RiTEK
- RiDATA
- Traxdata
- Smartbuy
- RiBEST
- ARITA
- imation
- Plextor

== See also ==
- List of companies of Taiwan
