= Maxell =

Japanese electronics company

Maxell, Ltd.

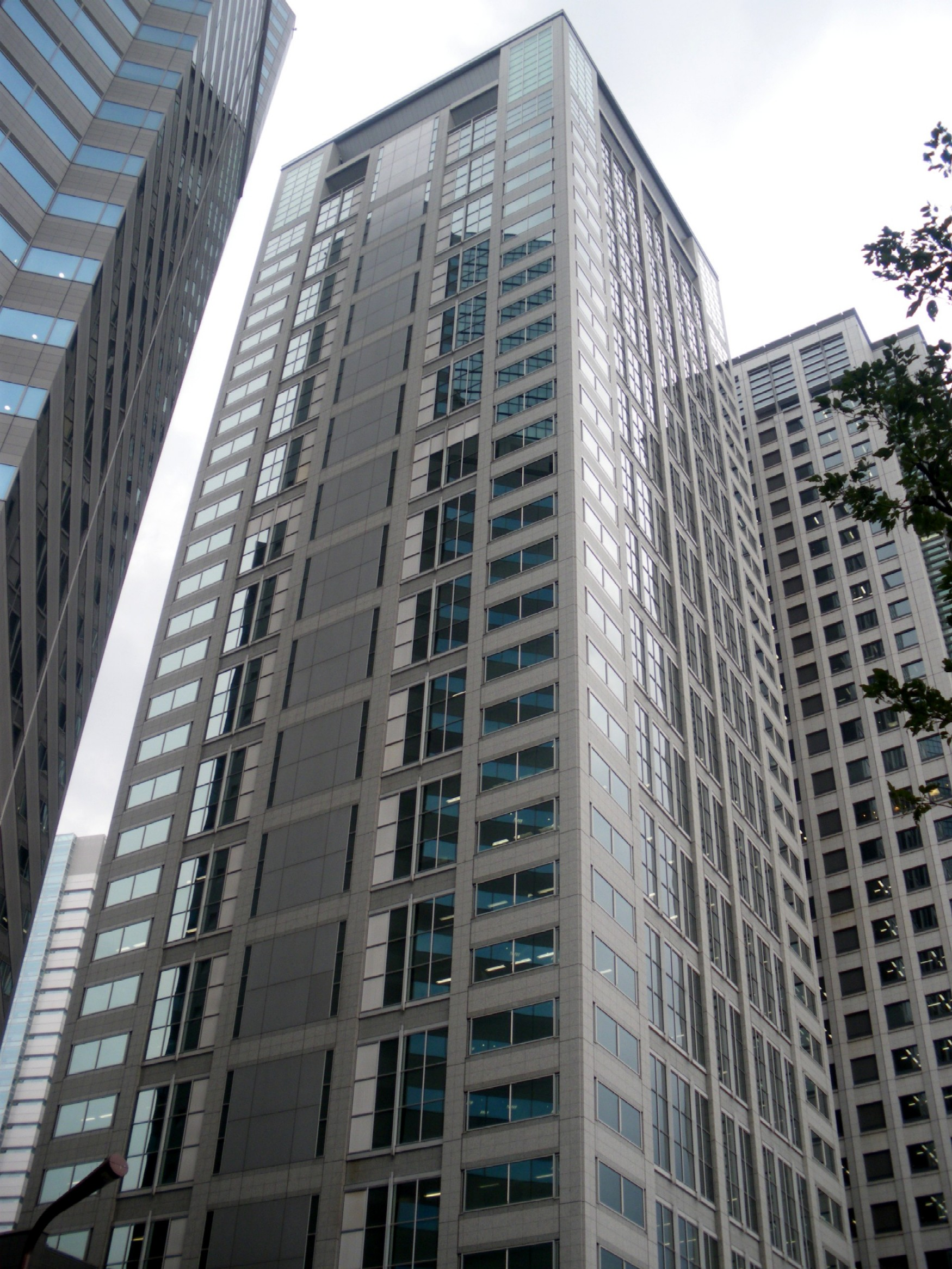
- Maxell Holdings office building in Tokyo
- Native name: マクセル株式会社
- Romanized name: Makuseru Kabushiki-gaisha
- Formerly: Maxell Electric Co., Ltd. (1960–1964); Hitachi Maxell, Ltd. (1964–2021)
- Type: Public KK
- Traded as: TYO: 6810
- Industry: Electronics
- Founded: September 3, 1960; 66 years ago Osaka Prefecture, Japan
- Headquarters: (Tokyo) 2-18-2, Iidabashi, Chiyoda-ku, Tokyo 102-8521, Japan; (Kyoto) 1 Koizumi Oyamazaki, Otokuni, Kyoto 618-8525, Japan
- Area served: Worldwide
- Key people: Yoshiharu Katsuta (President and CEO)
- Products: Consumer and industrial batteries; Data storage devices; Optical lenses; Headphones; LCD projectors; Laser projectors; Computer tapes; Functional materials; RFID systems
- Revenue: ▼¥135.1 billion (2016)
- Net income: ▲¥5.7 billion (2016)
- Owner: Hitachi (3.01%)
- Number of employees: 3,966 (2016)
- Website: maxell.co.jp

Maxell, Ltd. (マクセル株式会社, Makuseru Kabushiki-gaisha), commonly known as Maxell, is a Japanese company that manufactures consumer electronics.

The company's name is a contraction of "Maximum capacity dry cell". Its main products are batteries, wireless charging products, storage devices, (USB flash drive) LCD/laser projectors, and functional materials. In the past, the company manufactured recording media, including audio cassettes and blank VHS tapes, floppy disks, and recordable optical discs including CD-R/RW and DVD±RW.

On March 4, 2008, Maxell announced that they would outsource the manufacturing of their optical media.

== History ==
Maxell was formed in 1960, when a dry cell manufacturing plant was created at the company's headquarters in Ibaraki, Osaka. In 1961, Maxell Electric Industrial Company, Limited was created out of the dry battery and magnetic tape divisions of Nitto Electric Industrial Company, Limited (now Nitto Denko Corporation).

On March 18, 2014, the company was listed on the First Section of the Tokyo Stock Exchange. In 2013, Maxell, Ltd. acquired Hitachi Consumer Electronics, Co., Ltd.'s projector design, development and manufacturing assets and resources. On October 1, 2019, Maxell Corporation of America announced it would assume responsibility for all operations related to both Hitachi- brand and Maxell-brand projector products and accessories in the North American market.

== Products ==
=== Batteries ===
Maxell, along with Nagasaki University, NIAIST, and Subaru Corporation (the parent company of Subaru, makers of the R1e electric car), has developed a new chemistry for lithium-ion batteries. Part of the change is dropping the expensive cobalt element and using "nano infused lithium" with manganese, with twenty times more power storage, and the ability to mass-produce it inexpensively.

=== Audio cassettes ===
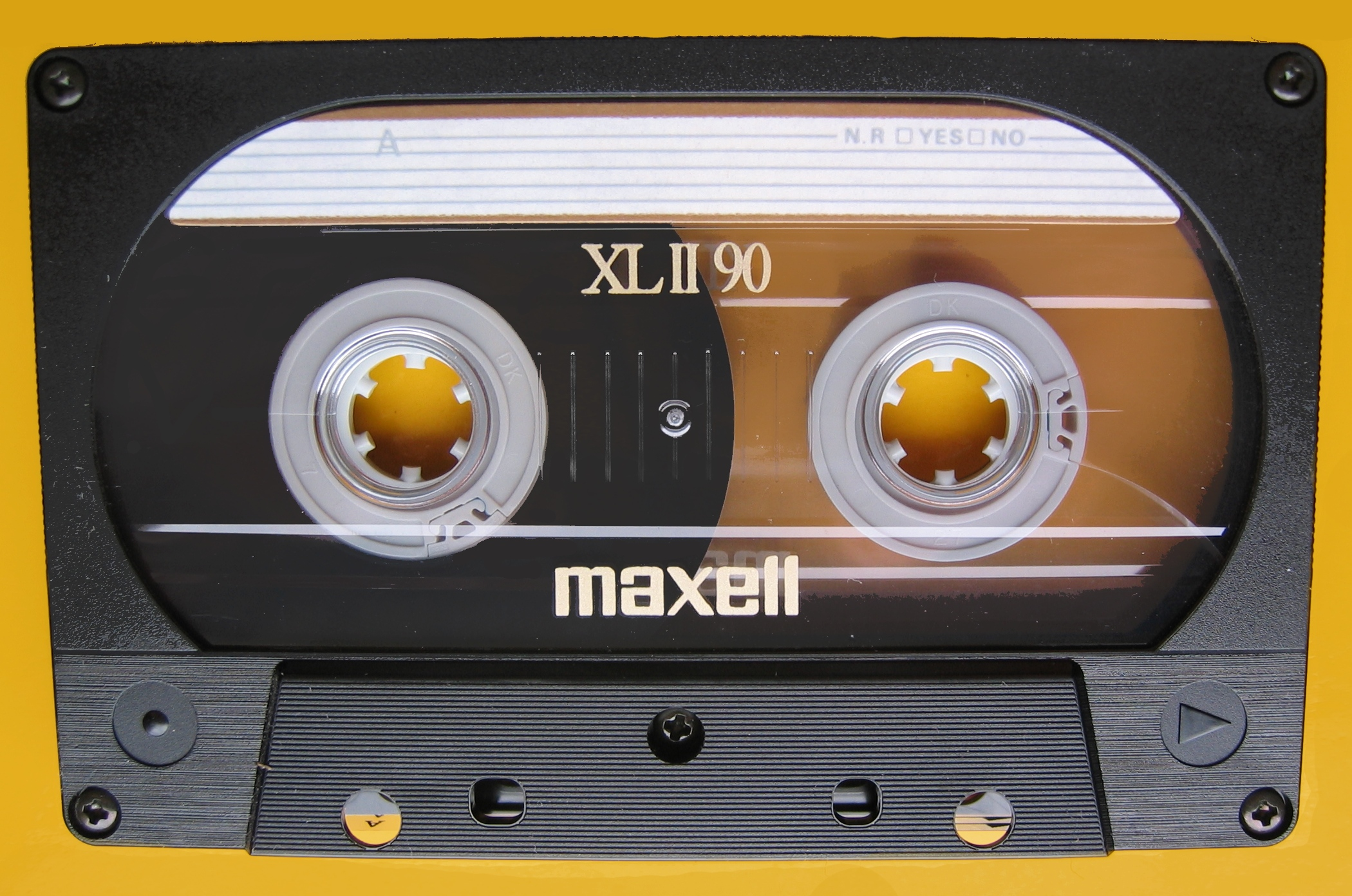
Maxell XL II compact cassette

During the height of the Compact Audio Cassette's popularity, Maxell's audio cassettes were held in high regard, producing some of the finest examples of the standard available. The performance of the XLII-S (CrO_{2}) and MX (pure metal particles) cassettes was highly regarded in the pre-digital domestic recording medium.

Until the beginning of 2020, Maxell still produced UR ferric-oxide-based cassettes for the international market. Maxell has since stopped distributing their UR cassettes outside of Japan. However in 2023 Maxell has started producing and selling UR cassettes outside of Japan on online marketplaces such as Amazon.

=== Optical media ===
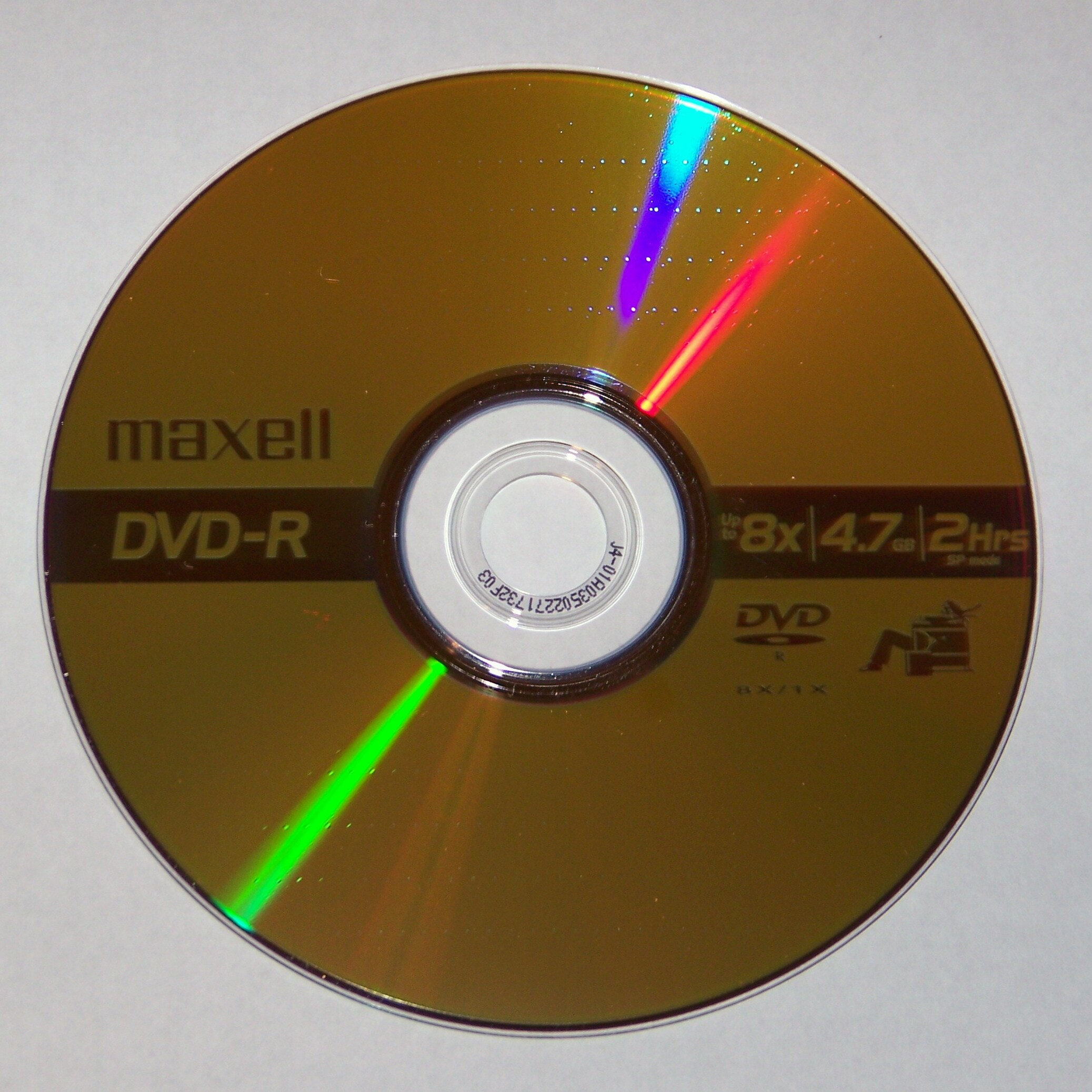
Maxell DVD-R

Since November 2006 the Taiwanese Ritek corporation became exclusive producer of Maxell CD-Rs and DVDs.

=== LCD and laser projectors ===
Maxell now assumes responsibility for all Hitachi-brand and Maxell-brand LCD projectors and laser projectors, as well as the Lecture Capture Collaboration Station.

== Advertising ==
Maxell "Blown Away Guy" advertisement for cassette tapes.

=== "Blown Away" (US) ===
In the 1980s, Maxell became an icon of pop culture when it produced advertisements popularly known as "Blown Away Guy" for its line of audio cassettes. The campaign began as a two-page advertising spread in Rolling Stone magazine in 1980. The photo shows a man sitting low in a (Le Corbusier Grand Confort LC2) high armed chair (on the right side of the spread) in front of, and facing, a JBL L100 speaker (the left side of the spread). His hair and necktie, along with the lampshade to the man's right and the martini glass on the low table to the man's left, are being blown back by the tremendous sound from speakers in front of him—supposedly due to the audio accuracy of Maxell's product. The man is shown desperately clinging to the armrests but defiantly looking ahead at the source of the music through sunglasses.

The ad campaign was conceived by Art Director Lars Anderson. Steve Steigman was the photographer. Steigman wanted a male model with long hair in order to show the effect of the wind, but when such a model could not be found on the day of the shoot, they used the makeup artist who was hired for the shoot, Jac Colello.

The same concept was used for television spots in 1981 which ran throughout the 1980s. These commercials showed nearly the same image as the print ad, but with the chair, a drink and nearby lamp all being pushed away from the stereo by the strong force of the sound waves, though the man calmly catches his drink before it slides off the end table. Richard Wagner's "Ride of the Valkyries" was used for music.

The "blown away guy" image became quite popular, and has been copied and parodied numerous times, including in the 1992 John Ritter film Stay Tuned (where a character's head is blown off by a "Max-Hell" tape), in the 1995 episode "Marge Be Not Proud" of the animated sitcom the Simpsons, in the 2005 episode "Model Misbehavior" of animated sitcom Family Guy, and in the 2010 movie Jackass 3D, where Ryan Dunn sits in a chair while the blast from a jet engine sends the set blowing away. The comic strip Bloom County also parodied the ad in showing one of its characters, Milo Bloom, at home watching MTV.

In 2005, Maxell revived the "Blown Away Guy" ad campaign. As Maxell now made blank DVDs and CDs, headphones, speakers, and blank audio and video tape, the ads were updated with photos of iPods and accessories underneath the image. "Get blown away" was the headline, while the copy urged consumers to use Maxell accessories to "make your small iPod sound like a huge audio system".

=== "Misheard" (UK) ===
In 1989, advertising agency HHCL was commissioned by Hitachi Maxell to make two UK TV advertisements for its audio cassette range. Both feature music fans, dressed appropriately for each genre, listening to two popular songs but mishearing the lyrics. The fans peel away cue cards, copying the style of Bob Dylan in Dont Look Back. The first ad uses the Desmond Dekker song "Israelites", with the second using "Into the Valley" by The Skids. In both ads, the conclusion is that if the songs were recorded on Maxell tapes, the fidelity would be much greater and the proper lyrics could be heard.

Additionally, a separate ad on the theme of the American Blown Away campaign was filmed for the UK, with musician Peter Murphy of the group Bauhaus as the man in the chair, and Night on Bald Mountain by Modest Mussorgsky as the music.

== See also ==
- List of digital camera brands
- Cassette demagnetizer
