= Dynamic range (disambiguation) =

The term dynamic range may mean:

- Dynamic range, dynamic range is a term used frequently in numerous fields to describe the ratio between the smallest and largest possible values of a changeable quantity.
- High-dynamic-range imaging, the intention of HDRI is to represent the wide range of intensity levels found in real scenes.
- High-dynamic-range rendering, HDRR is the rendering of computer graphics scenes by using lighting calculations done in a larger dynamic range than the final output range.
- Contrast ratio, the contrast ratio is a metric of a display system, defined as the ratio of the luminosity of the brightest and the darkest color the system is capable of producing.
- Exposure range, the range of light intensities that a camera can capture. A camera system with a higher exposure range will be able to record more details in the dark and light areas of a picture.
