= Digital Watermarking Alliance =

The Digital Watermarking Alliance is a group of like-minded companies that share a common interest in furthering the adoption of digital watermarking. The mission of the Digital Watermarking Alliance is:

- "to create awareness and promote the value of digital watermarking to content owners, industry, policy makers, and consumers."

== Founding members ==
The Digital Watermarking Alliance is made up of 12 companies that all have an established presence in the digital watermarking technology and solutions market. Member companies include:

- Cinea
- Digimarc
- GCS Research
- Jura
- MediaGrid
- Media Science International (MSI)
- Philips
- Signum
- Teletrax
- Thomson SA
- Cinavia [was Verance]
- Verimatrix, Inc.

== Current members ==
As of January 2018, the Digital Watermarking Alliance have 6 companies as its members.

- ContentArmor
- Irdeto
- MarkAny
- Media Science International (MSI)
- NexGuard
- Verimatrix

== See also ==
- Digital watermarking
- Audio watermark
- Watermark
- Watermark detection
- Watermark (data file)
- Copy attack
- Copy protection
