= Ultra HD Forum =

Organization

Logo from 2023

Ultra HD Forum is an organization whose goal is to help solve the real world hurdles in deploying Ultra HD video and thus to help promote UHD deployment. The Ultra HD Forum will help navigate amongst the standards related to high dynamic range (HDR), high frame rate (HFR), next generation audio (NGA), and wide color gamut (WCG). The Ultra HD Forum is an industry organisation that is complementary to the UHD Alliance (that maintains consumer-facing logos), covering different aspects of the UHD ecosystem.

== History ==
On July 21, 2015, the Ultra HD Forum announced that they had over 20 member companies after incorporating as a US-based non-profit a month earlier.

On April 18, 2016, the Ultra HD Forum announced industry guidelines for UHD Phase A content. The Ultra HD Forum also announced that it had increased to 46 member companies.

On January 5, 2017, the Ultra HD Forum announced that their guidelines had been updated to version 1.2 (including things like immersive audio, BT.2100, etc.) and that additional companies have joined which includes Google.

On September 14, 2017 the guidelines were updated to version 1.4 (including new definitions of PQ10 and HDR10, a matrix receiver/decoder capability combinations, the receiver/decoders combinations to render different formats, statistical methods of deriving CLL values, "graphics white" level for HLG as recommended by BBC and NHK, etc.)

== UHD Phase A ==
UHD Phase A covers broadcasting services to be launched by end of 2016 or early 2017. The guidelines for UHD Phase A are:

- Display resolution of 1080p or 2160p (progressive video only);
- Wide color gamut (WCG) – wider than Rec. 709) (Rec. 2020 must be supported);
- High dynamic range (HDR) – at least 13 stops (2^{13}=8192:1);
- Bit depth of 10-bits per sample;
- Frame rate of up to 60 fps (integer frame rates preferred);
- 5.1-channel audio or immersive audio;
- Closed captions/subtitles.

UHD Phase A consumer devices should be able to decode the High Efficiency Video Coding (HEVC) Main 10 profile Level 5.1 and process Hybrid log–gamma (HLG10) or Perceptual quantizer (PQ10)/HDR10 content using Rec. 2020 color primaries. The guidelines consider Rec. 2100 1080p content with Wide Color Gamut (BT.2020) and High Dynamic Range as Ultra HD service.

The guidelines also document live and pre-recorded production, as well as the combination of HDR and SDR video content and conversion between BT.709 and BT.2020 color spaces and different HDR metadata formats. Broadcasters are advised to provide backward compatibility by using HLG10 with BT.2020 color space, or simulcasting PQ10 or HDR10 streams (for example, using Scalable HEVC).

== UHD Phase B ==
An April 7, 2018 Ultra HD Forum published UHD Guidelines for phase B. Technologies that have been included in UHD Phase B, which targets UHD services launching in 2018-2020, include:

- Next Generation audio codecs supporting multiple audio objects (Dolby AC-4, DTS:X, MPEG-H 3D Audio);
- Scalable Video Coding to encode spatial (resolutions 1080p and 2160p), temporal (different frame rates), color gamut (BT.709 and BT.2020), and dynamic range (SDR and HDR) differences to provide backward-compatible video signal within a single program stream;
- Up to 12 bit color depth;
- High frame rates greater than 50/60 fps;
- UHD 8K resolution;
- Dynamic HDR metadata for per-scene coding (SMPTE ST 2094 Dynamic Metadata for Color Volume Transform):
  - Single-layer HDR (SL-HDR1);
  - Dual-layer HDR (Dolby Vision);
- ICtCp color encoding;
- Color Remapping Information (CRI).

== Founding/charter members ==
- Comcast
- Dolby
- Ericsson
- Harmonic
- LG
- Endeavor Streaming
- Sony

== Charter members ==
- Broadcom
- DirecTV
- DTS
- Fraunhofer Society
- Google
- Huawei
- NAB
- PBS
- Technicolor

== Contributor members ==
- AMD
- Arris
- Astro
- Brightcove
- CableLabs
- DTG
- Fox
- KPN
- Kudelski Group
- MarkAny
- Marvell
- NXP Semiconductors
- Sigma Designs
- Sky
- SKY PerfecTV!
- Sony Pictures
- Verimatrix

== Associate members ==
- Keepixo
- Ultra HD Forum Italia
- b.com
- BBright
- Beamr
- CTO innovation Consulting
- Communicare Digitale
- Content Armor
- Darbee Vision
- Deutsche TV-Platform
- Digigram
- DVEO
- Fairmile West
- MovieLabs
- NexGuard
- NGCodec
- SECURE-iC
- SCTE
- Spectral Edge
- TAG-Video Systems
- Testronic Labs
- TNO
- Unified Streaming
- Xylostream

== See also ==
- Rec. 2020 – ITU-R Recommendation for UHD-TV
- Rec. 2100 – ITU-R Recommendation for HDR-TV
