= CICP =

CICP may refer to:

- CICP-FM, a Native Communications station in Cranberry Portage, Manitoba, Canada
- Central Institute for Correctional Police, a law enforcement educational institution in Baoding City, Hebei, China
- Coding-independent code points, a way to signal the properties of a video or audio stream
- Countermeasures Injury Compensation Program, an entity within the Healthcare Systems Bureau
