= MarkAny =

South Korean IT company

MarkAny Inc.
- Industry: IT Security
- Founded: February 1999 in Seoul
- Headquarters: Seoul, South Korea
- Products: Computer security solutions for document security, mobile security, electronic document anti-forgery, CCTV video footage, and multimedia content
- Number of employees: 160
- Website: www.markany.com/eng/

MarkAny Inc. (Korean: 마크애니) is an information security company headquartered in Seoul, South Korea. MarkAny holds technologies including DRM, anti-forgery of electronic document, digital signature, and digital watermarking. Based on the technologies, MarkAny offers information security products for data protection, document encryption, electronic certification, and copyright protection.

== History ==
MarkAny has founded in February 1999 by Professor Choi Jong-uk and his graduate students at Sangmyung University. In 2002, MarkAny provided anti-forgery and physical copy protection solution for electronic certificate issuing system of Gangnam-gu Office, and in 2003, for National Tax Service of South Korea and Supreme Court of South Korea. Later MarkAny supplied its anti-forgery solution for more than 200 companies and government agencies worldwide. MarkAny started business on information security of digital CCTV footage data in 2013 by providing video data management system for CCTV control center of Tongyeong City Government. In 2014, MarkAny provided its audio watermarking solution to Seoul Broadcasting System, a South Korean television station. From 2017, MarkAny has been a member of Ultra HD Forum and enrolled as a supporter of the creation of forensic watermarking guideline with other watermarking vendor companies. In 2017 NAB Show, MarkAny have practiced real-time embedding of forensic watermark over UHD video stream. In late 2017, MarkAny announced its first cloud-based DRM solution.

Products provided by the company include DRM for documents and multimedia content, mobile device management, and digital watermarking for copyrighted multimedia.

== Controversy ==
MarkAny's digital watermarking technology has been controversial and issues have been raised due to its intrusive ability to monitor and modify media files, unbeknownst to the end user, by enveloping itself as part of a software's bundle. This "watermarking" feature stores a personally identifiable tracking ID, within obscure extension subtags permitted in these formats with features having discovered to "home-call" back to servers in the background. Active attempts to conceal their DRM from normal OS I/O operations, while appearing free of any alteration without the notifying the user or seeking user permission, has led to advisories on its rootkit and malware characteristics.

== Affiliations ==
As of January 2018, MarkAny is a member company of Digital Watermarking Alliance and a contributor member of Ultra HD Forum.
