= Graduated neutral-density filter =

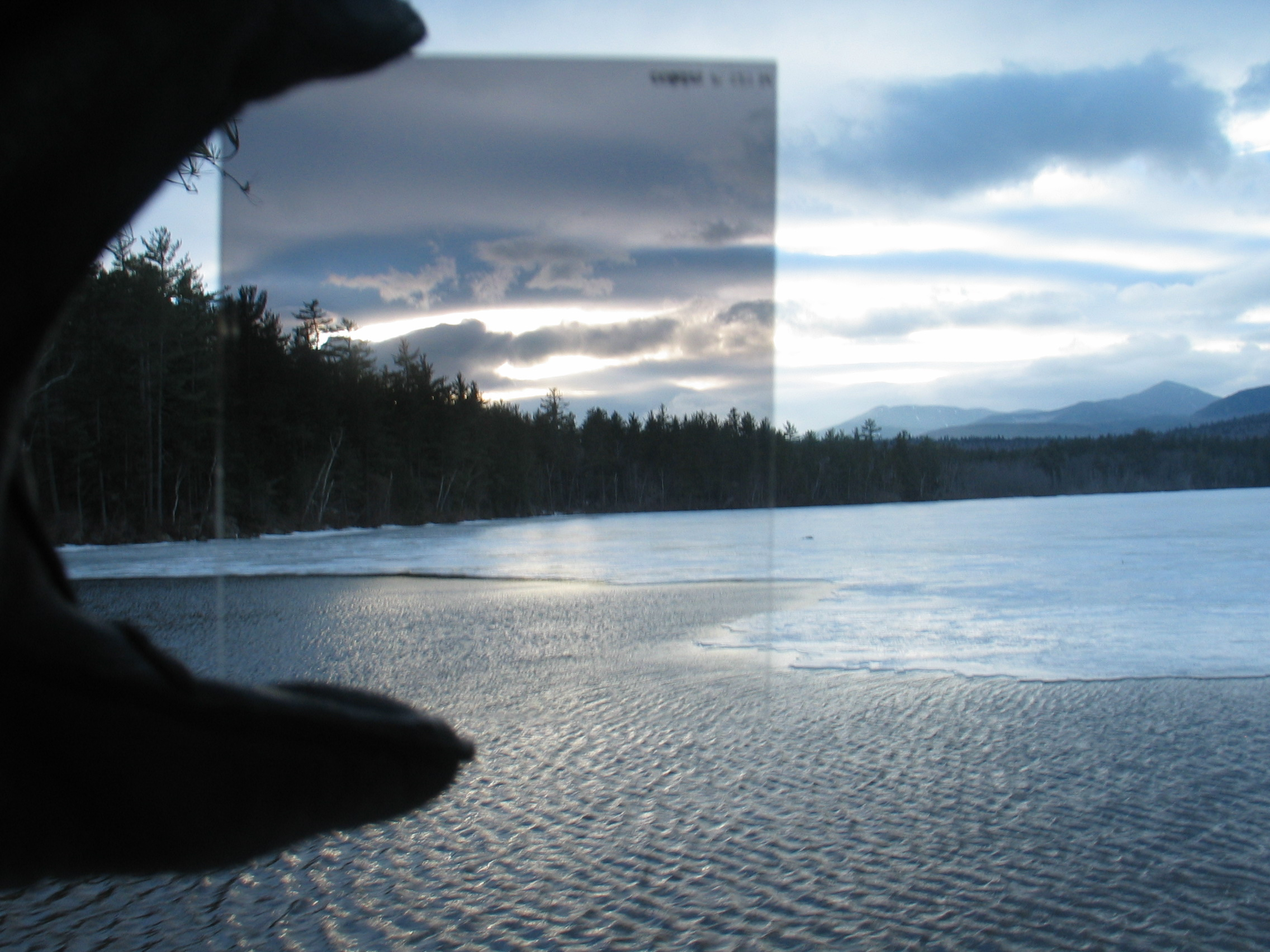
A GND filter held up to the horizon. Note the poor contrast in the overexposed part of the sky not covered by the filter.

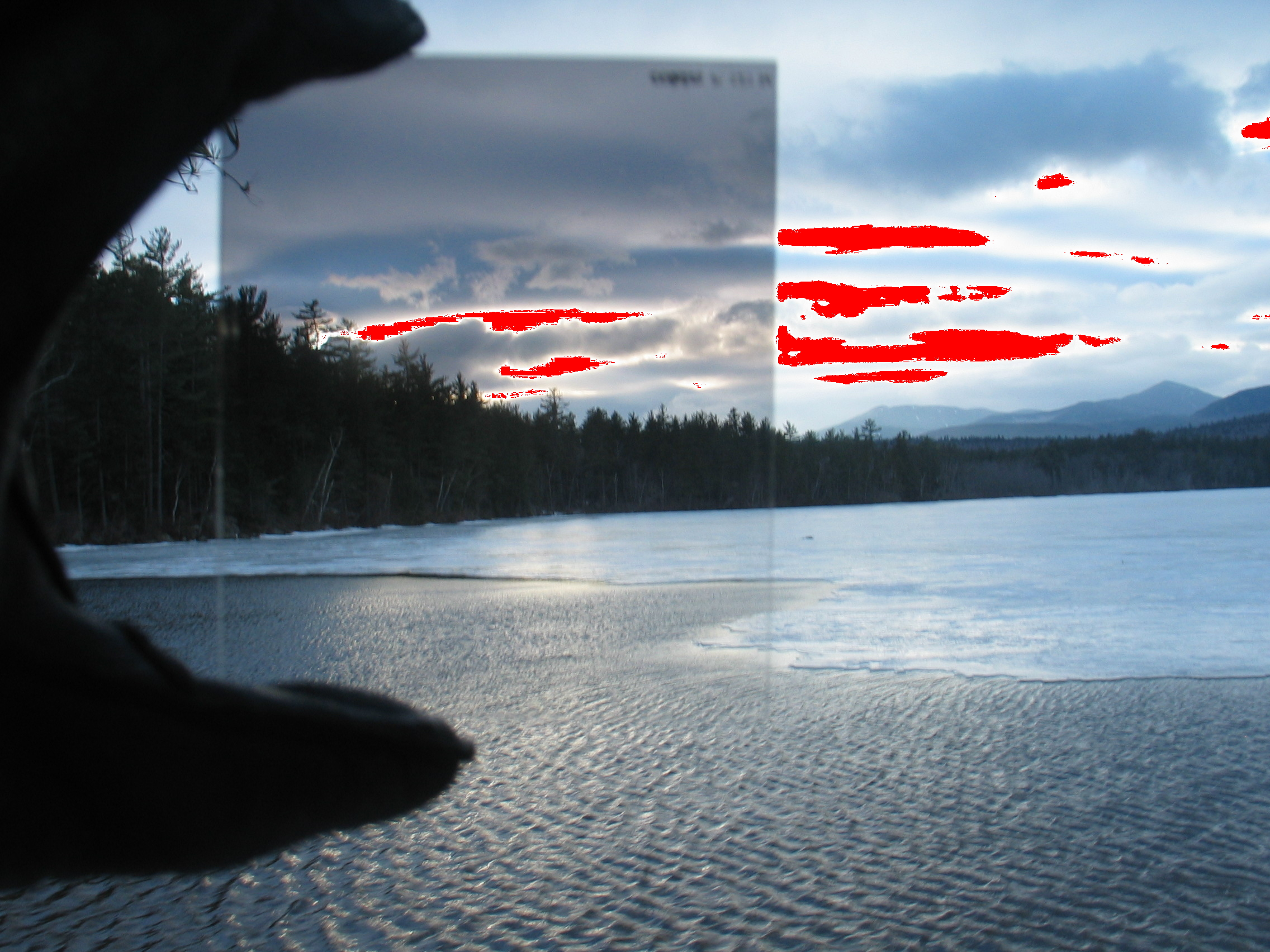
The same image with washed-out (white) pixels colored red. Note that clouds that are washed out without the GND filter show detail behind the filter.

A graduated neutral-density filter, also known as a graduated ND filter, split neutral-density filter, or just a graduated filter, is an optical filter that has a variable light transmission. Typically half of the filter is of neutral density which transitions, either abruptly or gradually, into the other half which is clear. It is used to bring an overly-bright part of a scene into the dynamic range of film or sensor. For example, it can be used to darken a bright sky so that both the sky and subject can be properly exposed. ND filters can come in a variety of shapes and sizes and densities and can be used in all types of photographic applications from still photography, motion photography and scientific applications.

Center-spot filters are ND graduated filters that are slightly opaque in the center and are clear at edges. These are used for special effects or to compensate for light falloff that is natural with large optics.

== History ==
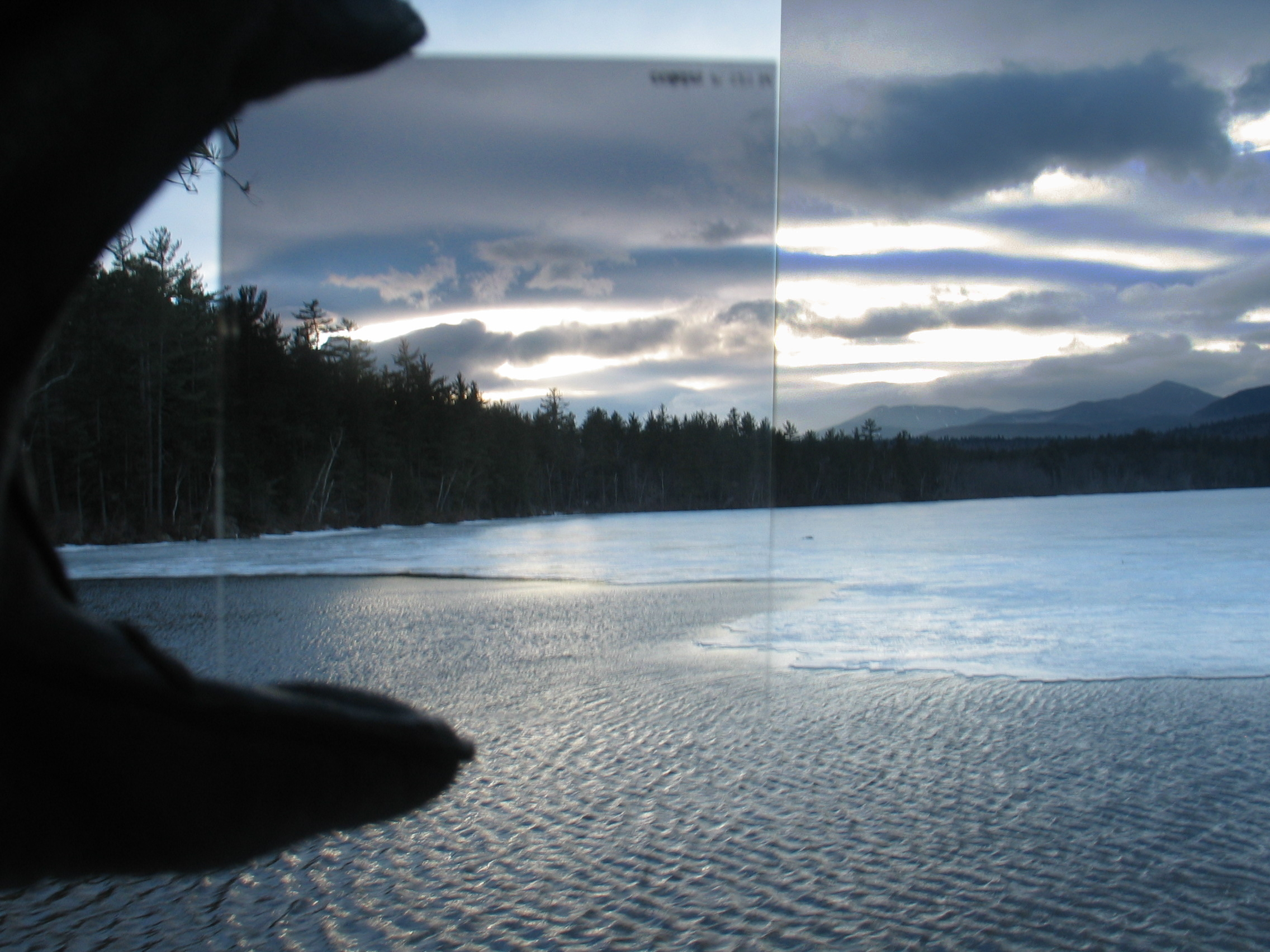
The same image with a GND-like effect applied to the right side of the image using a computer. While the overall effect is similar, regions of the image that were washed out are not recovered.

Graduated filters were used in the early twentieth century, for example for darkening skies in landscape photos. One advertised brand was called the "Lifa graduated filters for sky, cloud, and landscape photography". These "sky filters" were not necessarily neutral, since they were used for black-and-white photography, and sometimes used a yellow top half to darken blue skies more. In a discussion at the Royal Photographic Society in 1910, some "debatants" held the use of such "graduated color screens" to be quite limited.

In more modern times, the use of graduated ND filters was popularized by Galen Rowell. Singh-Ray sold them as "The Singh-Ray set of 4 Galen Rowell Graduated Neutral-Density Filters."

Although its importance may have lessened with the advent of the modern digital darkroom, graduated ND filters are still an important tool for professionals because a digital sensor that is clipping ("blown out" or "washed out") captures no usable data in the clipped area, an effect which cannot be corrected with later processing because data has been lost.

== Types ==
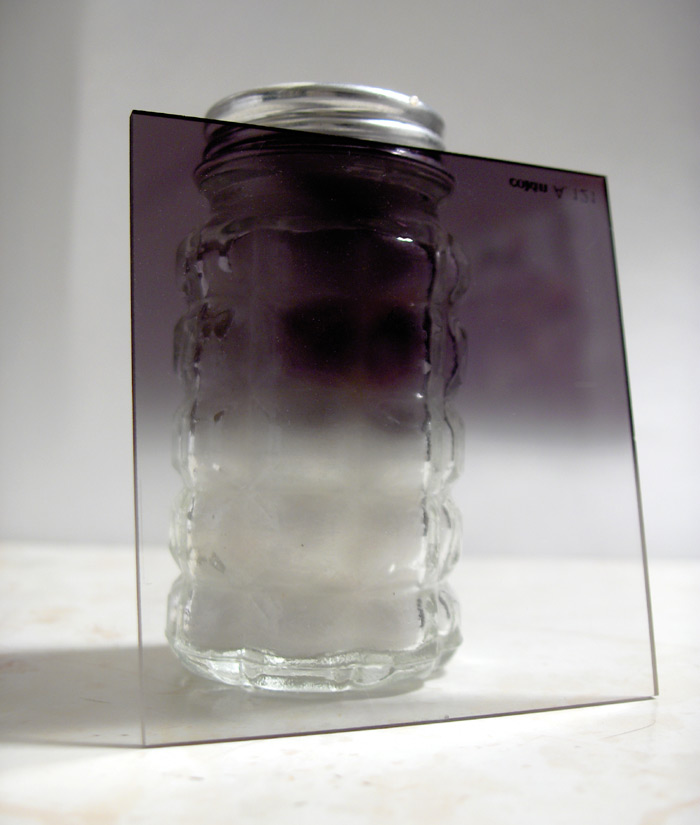
A Cokin 3-stop (ND8) graduated ND filter.

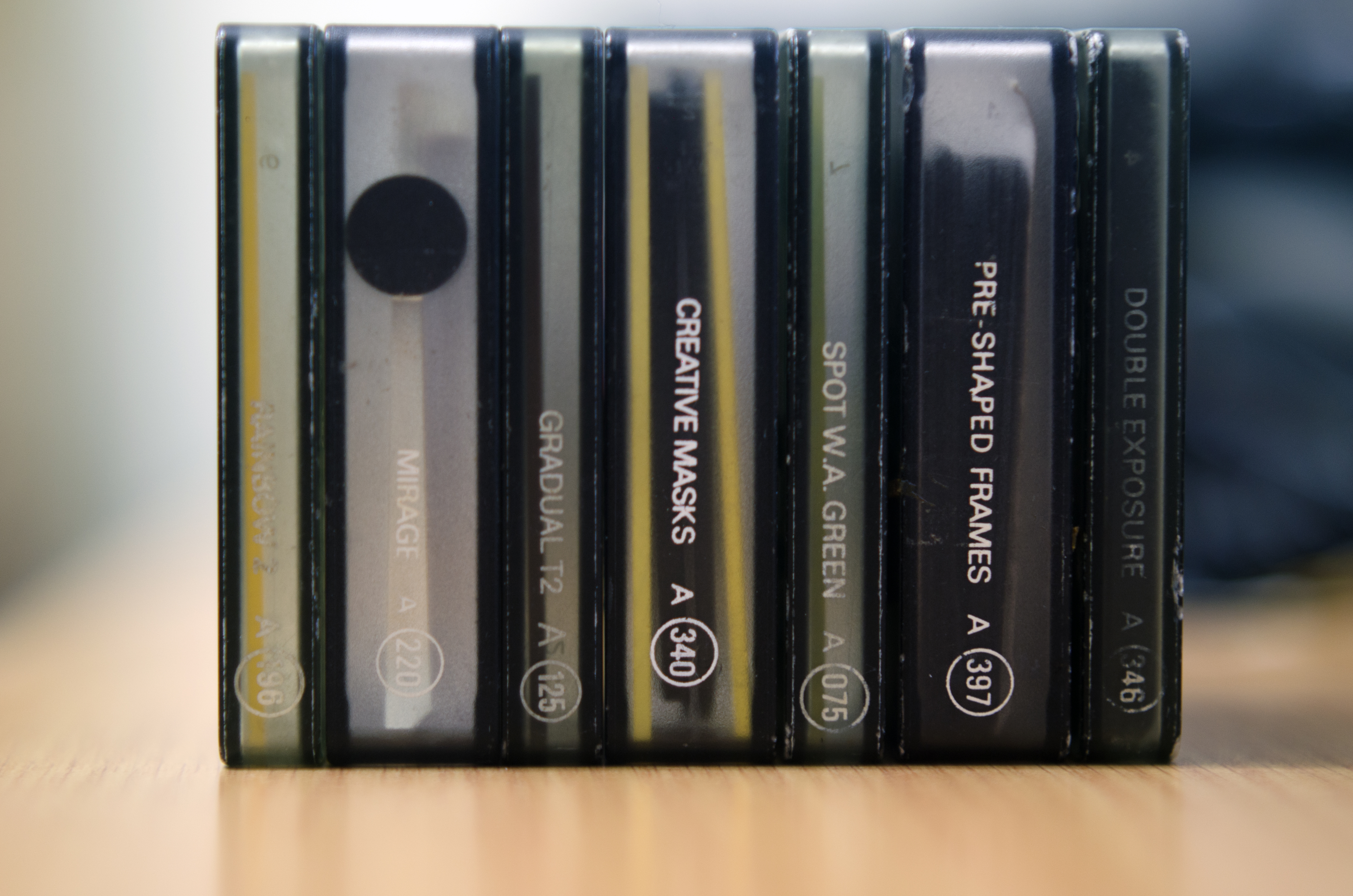
Stacked cases of Cokin filters.

The filter comes in many types but can be separated into two basic categories:

- Hard edge
- Soft edge

A hard edge is used when there is an abrupt change in brightness, such as a field with a horizon to a bright sky. A soft edge is a wider, smoother change from light to dark. This is used when the light and dark portions are not distinctly separated, such as a mountain and sky. A soft edge filter is less noticeable than a hard edge. It also has the benefit of making the sky more intense, darkening the sky the closer on the top. Below is a picture of what a hard edge and soft edge filter would look like.

Soft-edge GND filter

Hard-edge GND filter

== Multi-shoots high dynamic range ==
As an alternative to split graduated neutral density filters, some digital cameras offer built-in high-dynamic-range imaging (HDR) which allow the camera to capture and then combine different exposures of the same subject matter when shooting in RAW image format.

However, as long as a sufficiently short exposure time is available, it is possible to exactly mimic the effect of a graduated neutral density filter by using two exposures of the same scene one or several stops apart and blending them with a graduated mask in an image editor. This method has the advantage that the shape of the mask can be freely defined in editing. The disadvantage is that it only works with static subjects using a tripod.
