= High dynamic range =

Enhanced signal representation in digital media

High dynamic range (HDR), also known as wide dynamic range, extended dynamic range, or expanded dynamic range, is a signal with a higher dynamic range than usual.

The term is often used in discussing the dynamic ranges of images, videos, audio, or radio. It may also apply to the means of recording, processing, and reproducing such signals including analog and digitized signals.

== Imaging ==
In this context, the term high dynamic range means there is a large amount of variation in light levels within a scene or an image. The dynamic range refers to the range of luminosity between the brightest area and the darkest area of that scene or image.

High-dynamic-range imaging (HDRI) refers to the set of imaging technologies and techniques that allow the dynamic range of images or videos to be increased. It covers the acquisition, creation, storage, distribution and display of images and videos.

Modern films have often been shot with cameras featuring a higher dynamic range, and legacy films can be post-converted even if manual intervention will be needed for some frames (as when black-and-white films are converted to color). Also, special effects, especially those that mix real and synthetic footage, require both HDR shooting and rendering. HDR video is also needed in applications that demand high accuracy for capturing temporal aspects of changes in the scene. This is important in monitoring of some industrial processes such as welding, in predictive driver assistance systems in automotive industry, in surveillance video systems, and other applications.

=== Capture ===
In photography and videography, a technique, commonly named high dynamic range (HDR) allows the dynamic range of photos and videos to be captured beyond the native capability of the camera. It consists of capturing multiple frames of the same scene but with different exposures and then combining them into one, resulting in an image with a dynamic range higher than the individually captured frames.

Some of the sensors on modern phones and cameras may even combine the two images on-chip. This also allows a wider dynamic range being directly available to the user for display or processing without in-pixel compression. Some cameras designed for use in security applications can capture HDR videos by automatically providing two or more images for each frame, with changing exposure. For example, a sensor for 30fps video will give out 60fps with the odd frames at a short exposure time and the even frames at a longer exposure time.

Modern CMOS image sensors can often capture high dynamic range images from a single exposure. This reduces the need to use the multi-exposure HDR capture technique.

High dynamic range images are used in extreme dynamic range applications like welding or automotive work. In security cameras the term used instead of HDR is "wide dynamic range".

Because of the nonlinearity of some sensors image artifacts can be common.

=== Rendering ===
High-dynamic-range rendering (HDRR) is the real-time rendering and display of virtual environments using a dynamic range of 65,535:1 or higher (used in computer, gaming, and entertainment technology). HDRR does not require a HDR display and originally used tone mapping to display the rendering on a standard dynamic range display.

=== Dynamic range compression or expansion ===
The technologies used to store, transmit, display and print images have limited dynamic range. When captured or created images have a higher dynamic range, they must be tone mapped in order to reduce that dynamic range.

=== Storage ===
High-dynamic-range formats for image and video files are able to store more dynamic range than traditional 8-bit gamma formats. These formats include:

- HDR formats that can be used for both storage and transmission to HDR displays, such as:
  - For video:
    - HDR10
    - HDR10+
    - Dolby Vision
    - HLG (backwards compatible with SDR displays)
  - For images:
    - Gain map approaches, which adds a conversion layer on top of SDR data. The result is backwards compatible with SDR displays and storage.
      - ISO 21496-1 Gain Map, evolved from a unification of Apple and Adobe's proposals. Used by Apple under the name Adaptive HDR, ISO 21496-1 supports major file types like JPEG, HEIC, AVIF, JXL, etc. It is supported starting with macOS 15, iOS 18, iPadOS 18, Android 15, and Chromium based browsers.
      - Adobe Gain Map, a gain map image in a JPEG image file; used by Google under the name Ultra HDR and by Samsung under the name Super HDR. Supports gain on 1 or 3 channels. The Ultra HDR and ISO 21496-1 formats are encoded simultaneously in Android 15 for HDR compatibility across Android and iOS devices.
      - Apple Gain Map, which is not fully documented publicly, although documentation is available to decode these images.
      - AVIF is compatible with gain maps, but currently no encoder is available.
    - Apple EDR (Extreme Dynamic Range), used in macOS and iOS. Apple refers to EDR as the combination of hardware and software that allows displaying SDR and HDR content on the same screen.
    - HEIC (HEVC codec in HEIF file format)
    - AVIF (AV1 codec in HEIF file format)
    - JPEG XR
    - JPEG XL
    - HSP, CTA 2072 HDR Still Photo Interface (a format used by Panasonic cameras for photo capture in HDR with the HLG transfer function)
- Formats that are only used for storage purpose, such as:
  - Raw image formats
  - Formats that use a linear transfer function with high bit-depth
  - Formats that use a logarithmic transfer function
  - OpenEXR was created in 1999 by Industrial Light & Magic (ILM) and released in 2003 as an open source software library. OpenEXR is used for film and television production.
  - RGBE image format, invented by Gregory Ward Larson for the Radiance rendering system and widely used for lighting design and simulation.
  - Academy Color Encoding System (ACES) was created by the Academy of Motion Picture Arts and Sciences and released in December 2014. ACES is a complete color and file management system that works with almost any professional workflow and it supports both HDR and wide color gamut.

=== Transmission to displays ===
High dynamic range (HDR) is also the common name of a technology allowing to transmit high dynamic range videos and images to compatible displays. That technology also improves other aspects of transmitted images, such as color gamut.

In this context,

- HDR displays refers to displays compatible with that technology.
- HDR formats refers to formats such as HDR10, HDR10+, Dolby Vision and HLG.
- HDR video refers to a video encoded in an HDR format. Thoses HDR video have a greater bit depth, luminance and color volume than standard dynamic range (SDR) video which uses a conventional gamma curve.

On January 4, 2016, the Ultra HD Alliance announced their certification requirements for an HDR display. The HDR display must have either a peak brightness of over 1000 cd/m^{2} and a black level less than 0.05 cd/m^{2} (a contrast ratio of at least 20,000:1) or a peak brightness of over 540 cd/m^{2} and a black level less than 0.0005 cd/m^{2} (a contrast ratio of at least 1,080,000:1). The two options allow for different types of HDR displays such as LCD and OLED.

Some options to use HDR transfer functions that better match the human visual system other than a conventional gamma curve include the HLG and perceptual quantizer (PQ). HLG and PQ require a bit depth of 10-bits per sample.

=== Display ===
The dynamic range of a display refers to range of luminosity the display can reproduce, from the black level to its peak brightness. The contrast of a display refers to the ratio between the luminance of the brightest white and the darkest black that a monitor can produce. Multiple technologies allowed to increase the dynamic range of displays.

In May 2003, BrightSide Technologies demonstrated the first HDR display at the Display Week Symposium of the Society for Information Display. The display used an array of individually-controlled LEDs behind a conventional LCD panel in a configuration known as "local dimming". BrightSide later introduced a variety of related display and video technologies enabling visualization of HDR content. In April 2007, BrightSide Technologies was acquired by Dolby Laboratories.

OLED displays have high contrast. MiniLED improves contrast.

=== Realtime HDR vision ===
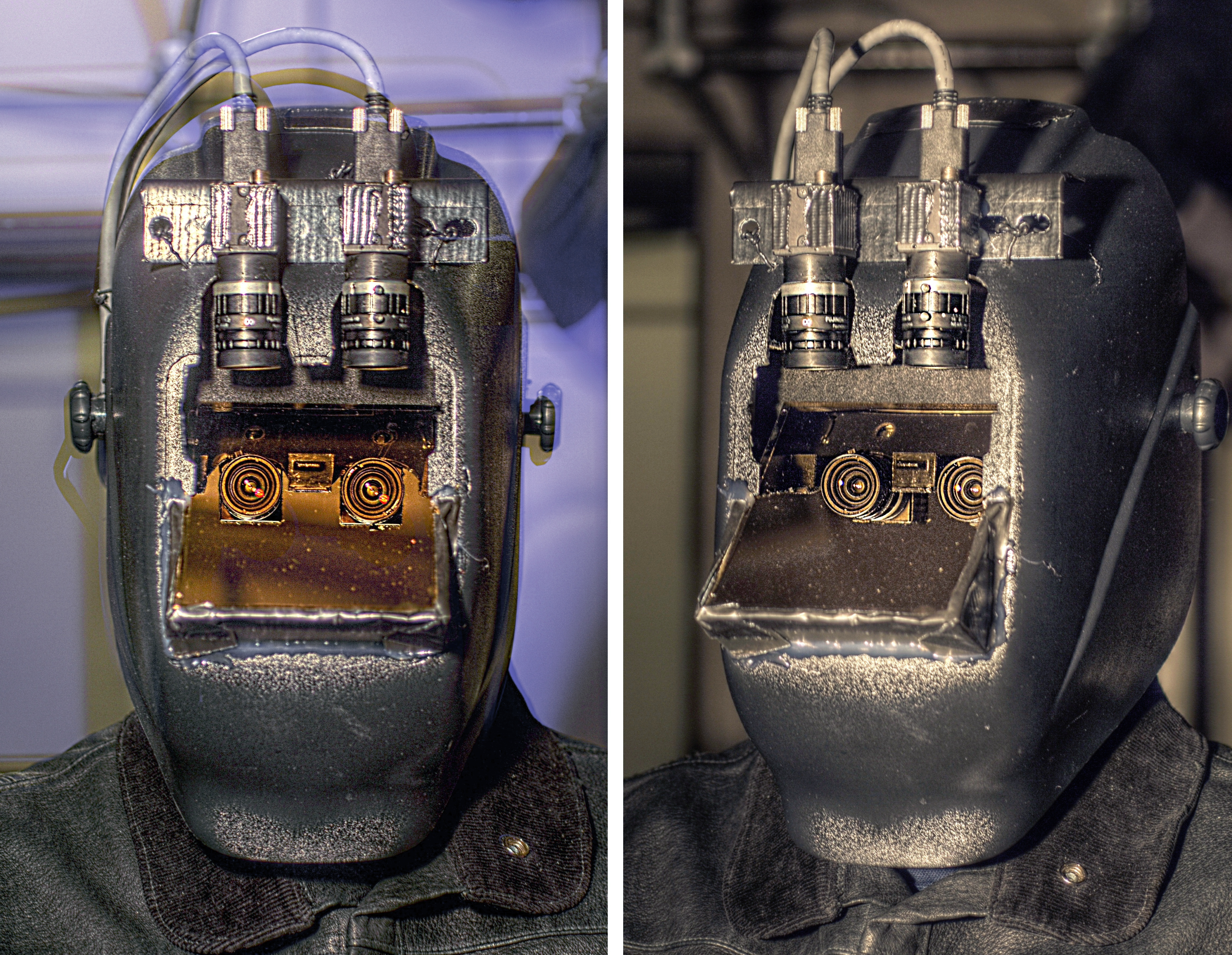
Mann's HDR (high-dynamic-range) welding helmet augments the image in dark areas and diminishes it in bright areas, thus implementing computer-mediated reality.

In the 1970s and 1980s, Steve Mann invented the Generation-1 and Generation-2 "Digital Eye Glass" as a vision aid to help people see better with some versions being built into welding helmets for HDR vision.

== Non-imaging ==
=== Audio ===
In Audio, the term high dynamic range means there is a lot of variation in the levels of the sound. Here, the dynamic range refers to the range between the highest volume and lowest volume of the sound.

XDR (audio) is used to provide higher-quality audio when using microphone sound systems or recording onto cassette tapes.

HDR Audio is a dynamic mixing technique used in EA Digital Illusions CE Frostbite Engine to allow relatively louder sounds to drown out softer sounds.

Dynamic range compression is a set of techniques used in audio recording and communication to put high-dynamic-range material through channels or media of lower dynamic range. Optionally, dynamic range expansion is used to restore the original high dynamic range on playback.

=== Radio ===
In radio, high dynamic range is important especially when there are potentially interfering signals. Measures such as spurious-free dynamic range are used to quantify the dynamic range of various system components such as frequency synthesizers. HDR concepts are important in both conventional and software-defined radio design.

=== Instrumentation ===
In many fields, instruments need to have a very high dynamic range. For example, in seismology, HDR accelerometers are needed, as in the ICEARRAY instruments.

== See also ==
- Rec. 2100 – ITU-R Recommendation for HDR
- Ultra HD Forum – Organization that has created standards for HDR
- Color space
- Color grading
