= ICEARRAY =

Icelandic seismic array

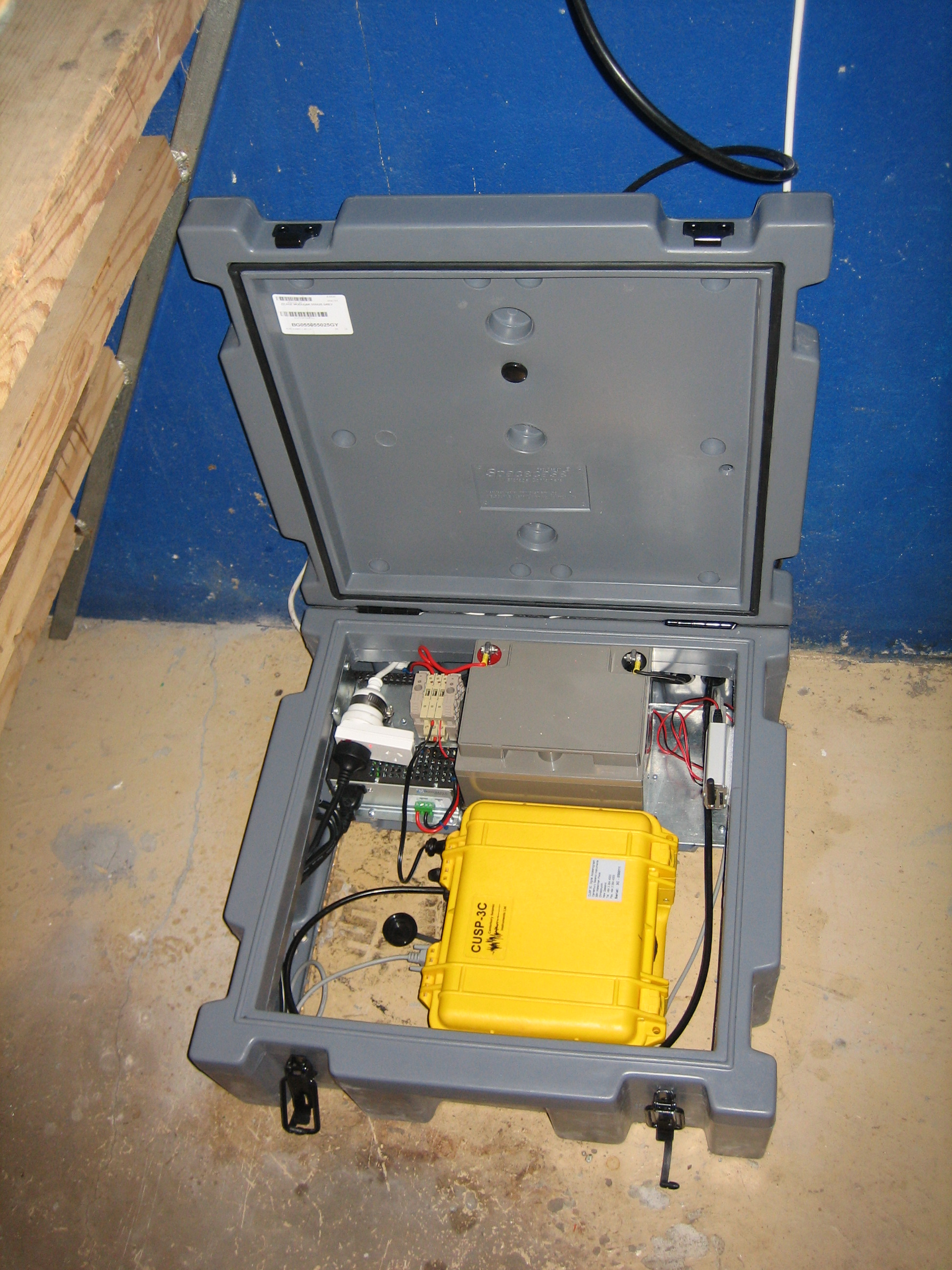
CUSP unit

ICEARRAY is an abbreviation for Icelandic Strong-motion Array. The ICEARRAY network is a seismic array of 14 strong-motion stations located within the South Iceland Seismic Zone. Each station consists of a seismograph situated in a protective housing. The stations are spread across a geographical area of approximately 3 km² in the town of Hveragerdi in south-western Iceland. Most of the units are located in the basements of residential buildings in Hveragerdi town centre, which is approximately 35 km southeast of Iceland's capital, Reykjavík. The ICEARRAY project is supported by the 6th Framework of the European Commission through the Marie Curie International Re-integration Grant, the Iceland Centre for Research and the University of Iceland Earthquake Engineering Research Centre.

== Instruments ==
The instruments used in the seismic array are CUSP-3Clp accelerometers manufactured by Canterbury Seismic Instruments Ltd. based in New Zealand. The instruments record three components of ground motion, i.e. one vertical and two horizontal components, over a high dynamic range. The instruments are connected to a GPS clock, ensuring a uniform time over the network. The instruments communicate via a wireless permanent GPRS connection. This enables remote configuration of individual units and near real-time alerts and data uploading. An important feature that has been developed during the establishment of the array is a common triggering scheme. This feature was designed in collaboration with the manufacturers of the units. In the event of two or more units receiving an earthquake trigger, the common triggering feature activates the entire array to start recording. This scheme ensures complete data coverage and greatly reduces the need to filter out noise and manmade disturbances.

== Geographical location ==
Iceland is located on the Mid-Atlantic Ridge, the extensional tectonic plate boundary between the North American Plate and the Eurasian Plate. It is also located over a deep-seated mantle plume known as the Iceland hotspot, which causes dynamic uplift of the Iceland Plateau, with associated volcanism and seismicity. The line of the Mid-Atlantic Ridge is offset by two transform zones in Iceland, the South Iceland Seismic Zone (SISZ) in the south and the Tjornes Fracture Zone in the north. The town of Hveragerdi is located at the western end of the SISZ, an area of considerable seismicity.

== Background ==
The South Iceland Seismic Zone (SISZ) has been the location of numerous large destructive earthquakes in the past. The SISZ is an east-west trending transform zone approximately 70 km long and 10–20 km wide. Destructive earthquake sequences in this region usually consist of several earthquakes exceeding a magnitude of 6.5 and with their epicentres located on north-south trending faults. Such a sequence started on 17 June 2000 at 15:40 local time with an earthquake of magnitude 6.5. It was followed on 21 June 2000 at 00:51 by a magnitude 6.4 event. Earthquake-induced damage was widespread, although fortunately there was no loss of life and no serious injuries.

== Purpose ==
The potential of these large destructive earthquakes occurring is a constant threat to local and national infrastructure, such as pipelines, electrical power transmission, roads, dams and bridges. The spatial variability of earthquake ground motions is a key aspect when designing infrastructure. It can have a dramatic effect on the response of structures and the extent of damage. In order to estimate the effects, it is necessary to develop models from data recorded on a seismograph array. This is the reason why the ICEARRAY was created. The models developed from the data recorded on the ICEARRAY have enabled the first reliable assessment of earthquake effects on infrastructure in the SISZ. The data also provides a physically realistic description of fault rupture. The models and simulations developed can be applied in other regions and the methods used provide a link between seismology and earthquake engineering
