= Range fractionation =

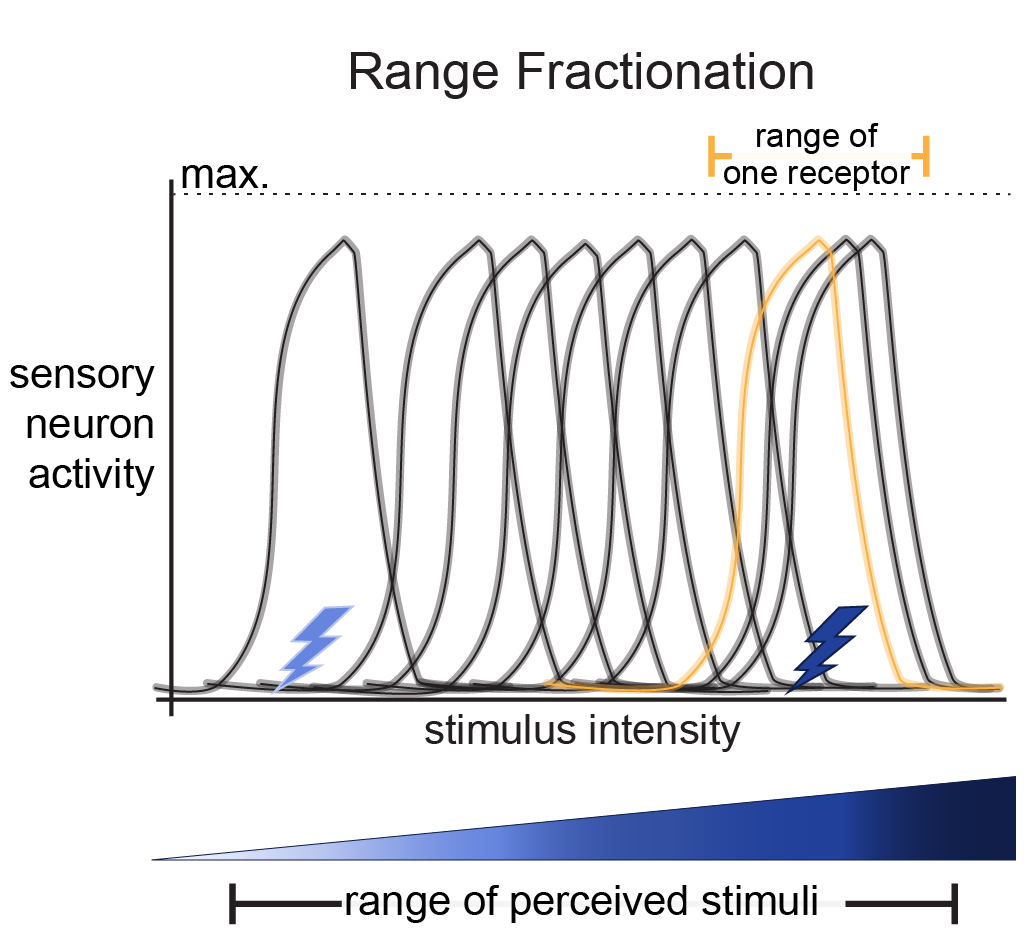
Graphical representation of range fractionation. In this diagram, 10 sensory neurons respond to fraction of the entire range of intensities of stimulus (blue, bottom). Together, all 10 of these neurons comprise the range of perceived stimuli", which is all of the discernable stimulus intensities to the system. Neuron response is indicated by "Sensory Neuron Activity" (or, Action Potential Firing Rate). The range of a single sensory neuron is indicated in yellow. In this depiction, low-intensity stimuli (light blue, left) would activate a single sensory neuron, whereas high-intensity stimuli (dark blue, right) may activate 3-4 neurons. The collective firing pattern of the sensory neurons will inform the nervous system about the stimulus properties.

Range fractionation is a term used in biology to describe the way by which a group of sensory neurons are able to encode varying magnitudes of a stimulus. Sense organs are usually composed of many sensory receptors measuring the same property. These sensory receptors show a limited degree of precision due to an upper limit in firing rate. If the receptors are endowed with distinct transfer functions in such a way that the points of highest sensitivity are scattered along the axis of the quality being measured, the precision of the sense organ as a whole can be increased.

The basis of the idea of range fractionation is that each stimulus (for example, touch) has a range of intensities that can be sensed (light-touch to deep/hard-touch). For an organism to be able to sense a range of stimulus intensities, sensory neurons are tuned to fractions of the entire range. Collectively, the pattern of activity among the sensory neurons is how the organism can identify specific stimulus parameters. This was shown for proprioceptive neurons in the locust leg, proprioceptive neurons in the stick insect, Johnston's Organ neurons in Drosophila, and in auditory-sensing neurons in crickets.

Range fraction is similar to the labeled line theory in that they both describe a phenomenon by which sensory neurons divide the task of encoding a range of stimulus intensities. However the difference lies within the downstream synaptic partners. Labeled line theory describes fully segregated channels postsynaptically. In contrast, sensory neurons that use range fractionation have common synaptic partners, and it is there collective activity that is informative of the stimulus type.
