= Copy attack =

Computer security exploit

The copy attack is an attack on certain digital watermarking systems proposed by M. Kutter, S. Voloshynovskiy, and A. Herrige in a paper presented in January, 2000 at the Photonics West SPIE convention.

In some scenarios, a digital watermark is added to a piece of media such as an image, film, or audio clip, to prove its authenticity. If a piece of media were presented and found to lack a watermark, it would be considered suspect. Alternatively, a security system could be devised which would limit a user's ability to manipulate any piece of media which contained a watermark. For instance, a DVD burner may prohibit making copies of a film which contained a watermark.

The copy attack attempts to thwart the effectiveness of such systems by estimating the watermark given in an originally watermarked piece of media, and then adding that watermark to an un-watermarked piece. In the first scenario listed above, this would allow an attacker to have an inauthentic image declared authentic, since it contains a watermark. In the second scenario, an attacker could flood the market with content which ordinarily would allow a user to manipulate it as he saw fit, but due to the presence of the watermark, limitations would be imposed. In this way, schemes which sought to limit use of watermarked media may prove to be too unpopular for wide distribution.

In a 2003 paper presented at the International Conference on Acoustics, Speech, and Signal Processing, John Barr, Brett Bradley, and Brett T. Hannigan of Digimarc describe a way to tie the content of the digital watermark to the underlying image, so that if the watermark were placed into a different image, the watermark detection system would not authenticate it.
