= Ultra HDR =

Image format for HDR using JPEG with backwards compatibility

- Developer: Google
- Release: 4 October 2023; 3 years ago
- Stable release: 1.1 / October 25, 2024; 23 months ago
- Website: developer.android.com/media/platform/hdr-image-format

Ultra HDR is an image format that encodes a gain map into the metadata of a JPEG image. This allows for compatible decoders to decode and display a high dynamic range (HDR) image while maintaining backwards compatibility with incompatible decoders and standard dynamic range (SDR) panels. This format was first deployed on the Android 14 operating system, with display support later being added to Google Chrome, Microsoft Edge, Brave, Opera, Safari, and multiple other macOS and iOS applications.

== Technical details ==
An SDR image (left) and the corresponding gain map (right) used to derive the HDR image on compatible displays

An Ultra HDR image file contains a 8-bit standard dynamic range (SDR) image together with a gain map encoded as a monochromatic JPEG image. XMP tags such as hdrgm:GainMapMin and hdrgm:GainMapMax are placed inside the gain map's JPEG container to indicate how the 8-bit pixel values (0–255) should be converted into base-2 log values, by which the corresponding pixels in the main image are multiplied to derive the HDR image. The gain map may be downsampled to 1/4 of the width and height of the primary image, or 1/16 the number of pixels, and must have a similar aspect ratio.

== Related gain map HDR image formats ==
Ultra HDR uses an encoding scheme developed by Adobe. Samsung brands Ultra HDR as Super HDR. A similar standard for gain map based HDR with backwards compatible SDR support for any image file type, including JPEG, is ISO 21496-1. ISO 21496-1 is branded by Apple as Adaptive HDR. As of Android 15, the Ultra HDR and ISO 21496-1 over JPEG formats are encoded simultaneously for HDR compatibility across Android and Apple devices.

== See also ==
- Jpegli
