= Coding-independent code points =

Coding-independent code points (CICP) is a way to signal the properties of a video or audio stream. It can describe the color profile of videos (and still images) in a simpler way than the use of ICC profiles. It is defined in both ITU-T H.273 and ISO/IEC 23091-2. It is used by multiple codecs including AVC, HEVC, VVC, and AVIF.

== Standardization ==
- ITU-T H.273, for video.
- ISO/IEC 23001-8:2016, part of MPEG-B (system technologies). Later split into three parts:
  - ISO/IEC 23091-1:2018, for systems.
  - ISO/IEC 23091-2:2019, for video. (Revised by ISO/IEC 23091-2:2021).
  - ISO/IEC 23091-3:2018, for audio.

== Common CICP values ==
Common combinations of H.273 parameters are summarized in ITU-T Series H Supplement 19.

Common CICP values
	Code point value	Meaning
Color primaries	1	Rec. 709, sRGB
Color primaries	5	Rec. 601 (PAL)
Color primaries	6	Rec. 601 (NTSC)
Color primaries	9	Rec. 2020, Rec. 2100
Color primaries	12	P3-D65
Transfer function	1, 6, 14, 15	SDR (Rec. 709)
Transfer function	16	PQ
Transfer function	18	HLG
Matrix coefficients	0	R'G'B'
Matrix coefficients	1	Y'CbCr (for Rec. 709)
Matrix coefficients	5, 6	Y'CbCr (for Rec. 601)
Matrix coefficients	9	Y'CbCr (for Rec. 2020, Rec. 2100)
Matrix coefficients	14	ICtCp (for Rec. 2100)
