= Verimatrix =

Content security company

- Traded as: CAC Small
- Industry: Cybersecurity; Streaming Media; Anti-Piracy; Content Security; Pay Television
- Founded: 1995
- Headquarters: Meyreuil, France
- Key people: Laurent Dechaux (CEO); Amedeo D'Angelo (executive chairman); Jean-François Labadie (Chief Financial Officer)

Verimatrix (Euronext: VMX) provides cybersecurity products and services that protect video content, streaming media, mobile applications, websites and APIs. The company merged with Inside Secure in 2019. It is headquartered in France and Laurent Dechaux is the CEO.

== History ==
Founded in 1995 by Jacek Kowalski and Bruno Charrat, Verimatrix was initially a content security specialist. In 2017, the company acquired Meontrust, an internet software and services company that provides authentication services, as well as the MiriMON technology and development team from TV audience analytics company Genius Digital.

In 2019, Verimatrix was acquired by French company Inside Secure. The combined company adopted the Verimatrix name. After its merger with Inside Secure, the company focused on cybersecurity for the entertainment, mobile, IoT, and connected cars industries. 2019 is also when Verimatrix sold its Silicon IP, Secure Protocols and Provisioning business to Rambus Inc.

In 2023, the cybersecurity company received several awards: it was named a winner in mobile app security in the 2023 Global Infosec Awards by Cyber Defense Magazine; received the Biggest Cybersecurity Brand Growth - Europe award from the Cybersecurity Excellence Awards; and received a Stevie management award.

In April 2023, Verimatrix launched a cybersecurity microsite for CISOs, SOC teams, fraud departments, and developers. The site contains the latest information on mobile app security. Similarly, the company's VMX Labs provide ongoing cyber threat advisories, as well as information from team members who investigate threat types.

In December 2025, Verimatrix agreed to sell their XTD product line, including associated patents and employees, to the Belgian company Guardsquare, developer of ProGuard, for US$8.5 million, to be adjusted at closing.. Verimatrix plans to focus on their anti-piracy products, which accounts for a majority of their current revenue.

== Products ==
Verimatrix has a number of cybersecurity services and products including threat detection and response capabilities.

=== App Shield ===
This product provides SaaS in-app protection in the form of zero code hardening of iOS and Android mobile apps to protect against reverse engineering and other attacks.

=== Code Shield ===
Code Shield protects application code with a customizable security toolkit.

=== Key Shield ===
Key shield is an engineering toolkit used to protect cryptographic keys to meet high-end compliance requirements. In 2022, Verimatrix announced new options in Key Shield for SoftPOS users.

=== Secure Delivery Platform ===
This platform provides cybersecurity and anti-piracy services for media companies, content owners, streaming media providers, and broadcast operators. It was released in 2022 at which time it included Streamkeeper DRM and Streamkeeper Counterspy.

=== Streamkeeper ===
Streamkeeper, released in 2021, is a content protection product that combines the following Verimatrix products: Multi-DRM, Watermarking, and Counterspy. It is used to prevent parasitic piracy, also known as CDN Leeching or vampire streaming. Streamkeeper was named a winner of the NAB Product of the Year Awards in the AI/Machine Learning category.

=== Streamkeeper Multi-DRM ===
Streamkeeper multi-DRM provides content protection with a focus on delivering video for a good viewer experience. It was integrated with Surveyor ABR Active in 2022. Surveyor is Telestream iQ's ABR streaming QoE and QoS monitoring technology.

=== Video Content Authority System ===
This SaaS product provides cloud-based anti-piracy security.

=== Extended Threat Defense (XTD) ===
XTD is used to prevent, detect, and predict threats to mobile apps and other devices that connect to business infrastructure. It is an enterprise SaaS solution.

=== Web Protect ===
In August 2022, the company released Verimatrix Web Protect. It provides website security services and is offered through a partnership with Reflectiz, a cybersecurity company.

== Leadership ==
Asaf Ashkenazi was appointed CEO of Verimatrix in August 2022. He joined the company in 2018 and held the titles of Chief Strategy Officer and Chief Operations Officer before his appointment as CEO.

His previous positions include vice president of product strategy at Inside Secure; vice president of IoT security products at Rambus; and lead for security products at Qualcomm. He also worked at Freescale Semiconductor and Motorola, and served on the board of the FIDO Alliance.
