= Digital watermarking =

Marker covertly embedded in a signal

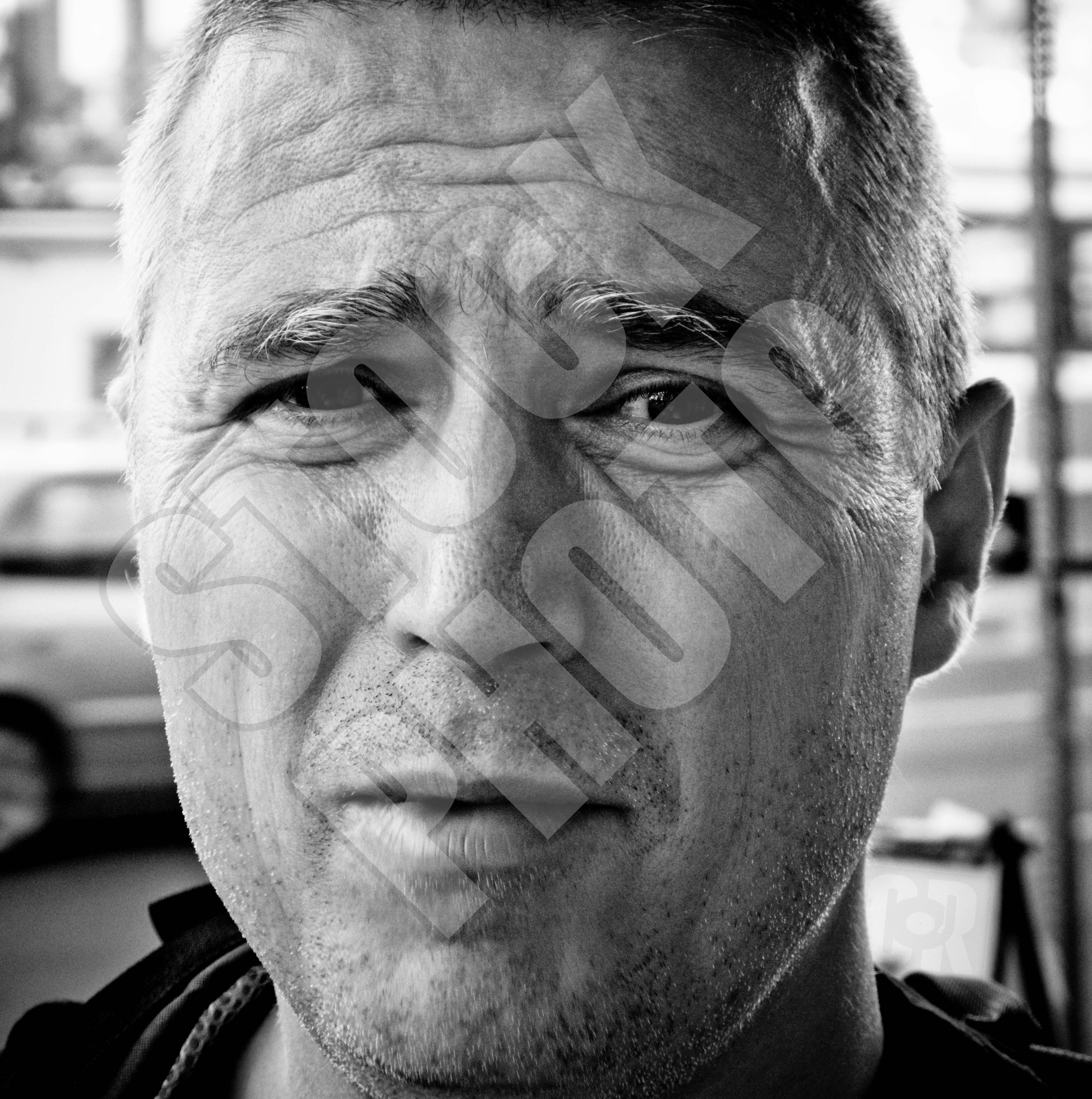
Fictitious example of a digital watermark with the words "STOCK PHOTO" on an image of Todd Graham

A digital watermark is a kind of marker covertly embedded in a noise-tolerant signal such as audio, video or image data. It is typically used to identify ownership of the copyright of such a signal. Digital watermarking is the process of hiding digital information in a carrier signal; the hidden information should, but does not need to, contain a relation to the carrier signal. Digital watermarks may be used to verify the authenticity or integrity of the carrier signal or to show the identity of its owners. It is prominently used for tracing copyright infringements and for banknote authentication.

Like traditional physical watermarks, digital watermarks are often only perceptible under certain conditions, e.g. after using some algorithm. If a digital watermark distorts the carrier signal in a way that it becomes easily perceivable, it may be considered less effective depending on its purpose. Traditional watermarks may be applied to visible media (like images or video), whereas in digital watermarking, the signal may be audio, pictures, video, texts or 3D models. A signal may carry several different watermarks at the same time. Unlike metadata that is added to the carrier signal, a digital watermark does not change the size of the carrier signal.

The needed properties of a digital watermark depend on the use case in which it is applied. For marking media files with copyright information, a digital watermark has to be rather robust against modifications that can be applied to the carrier signal. Instead, if integrity has to be ensured, a fragile watermark would be applied.

Both steganography and digital watermarking employ steganographic techniques to embed data covertly in noisy signals. While steganography aims for imperceptibility to human senses, digital watermarking tries to control the robustness as top priority.

Since a digital copy of data is the same as the original, digital watermarking is a passive protection tool. It just marks data, but does not degrade it or control access to the data.

One application of digital watermarking is source tracking. A watermark is embedded into a digital signal at each point of distribution. If a copy of the work is found later, then the watermark may be retrieved from the copy and the source of the distribution is known. This technique has reportedly been used to detect the source of illegally copied movies.

== History ==
Watermarks are identification marks produced during the paper-making process. The first watermarks appeared in Italy during the 13th century, but their use rapidly spread across Europe. They were used as a means to identify the paper maker or the trade guild that manufactured the paper. The marks were often created by a wire sewn onto the paper mold. Watermarks continue to be used today as manufacturers' marks and to prevent forgery.

The term digital watermark was coined by Andrew Tirkel and Charles Osborne in December 1992. The first successful embedding and extraction of a steganographic spread spectrum watermark was demonstrated in 1993 by Andrew Tirkel, Gerard Rankin, Ron Van Schyndel, Charles Osborne, and others.

== Applications ==
Digital watermarking may be used for a wide range of applications, such as:

- Copyright protection in some media like digital artworks.
- Source tracking (different recipients get differently watermarked content)
- Broadcast monitoring (television news often contains watermarked video from international agencies)
- Video authentication
- Software crippling on screencasting and video editing software programs, to encourage users to purchase the full version
- ID card authentication
- Fraud and tamper detection
- Content management on social networks
- AI content watermarking (e.g. Google SynthID and OpenAI Sora)

== Digital watermarking life-cycle phases ==
General digital watermark life-cycle phases with embedding, attacking, and detection and retrieval functions

The information to be embedded in a signal is called a digital watermark, although in some contexts the phrase digital watermark refers to the difference between the watermarked signal and the cover signal. The signal where the watermark is to be embedded is called the host signal. A watermarking system is usually divided into three distinct steps: embedding, attack, and detection. In embedding, an algorithm accepts the host and the data to be embedded, and produces a watermarked signal. Then the watermarked digital signal is transmitted or stored, usually transmitted to another person.

If this person makes a modification, this is called an attack or tampering. While the modification may not be malicious, the term attack arises from copyright protection applications, where third parties may attempt to remove the digital watermark through modification. There are many possible modifications, for example, affine transformations, lossy compression, resolution reduction, standards conversion (e.g. NTSC to PAL), cropping an image or video, or intentionally adding noise.

Detection (often called extraction) is an algorithm that is applied to the attacked signal to attempt to extract the watermark from it. If the signal was unmodified during transmission, then the watermark still is present and it may be easily extracted. In robust digital watermarking applications, the extraction algorithm should be able to produce the watermark correctly, even if the modifications were strong. In fragile digital watermarking, the extraction algorithm should fail if any change is made to the signal.

== Classification ==
A digital watermark is called robust with respect to transformations if the embedded information may be detected reliably from the marked signal, even if degraded by severe or multiple transformations. Typical image degradations are JPEG compression, rotation, cropping, additive noise, and quantization. For video content, temporal modifications and MPEG compression often are added to this list. A digital watermark is called imperceptible if the watermarked content is perceptually equivalent to the original, unwatermarked content. In general, it is easy to create either robust watermarks or imperceptible watermarks, but the creation of both robust and imperceptible watermarks has proven to be quite challenging. Robust imperceptible watermarks have been proposed as a tool for the protection of digital content, e.g., for Compact Disc and DVD copy protection, such as an embedded no-copy-allowed flag in professional video content.

Digital watermarking techniques may be classified in several ways.

=== Robustness ===
A digital watermark is called fragile if it fails to be detectable after the slightest modification. Fragile watermarks are commonly used for tamper detection (integrity proof).

A digital watermark is called semi-fragile if it resists benign transformations, but fails detection after malignant transformations. Semi-fragile watermarks are commonly used to detect malignant transformations.

A digital watermark is called robust if it resists a designated class of transformations. Robust watermarks may be used in copy protection applications to carry copy and no access control information.

=== Perceptibility ===
A digital watermark is called imperceptible if the original cover signal and the marked signal are perceptually indistinguishable.

A digital watermark is called perceptible if its presence in the marked signal is noticeable (e.g. digital on-screen graphics like a network logo, content bug, codes, opaque images). On videos and images, some are made transparent/translucent for convenience for consumers due to the fact that they block portion of the view; therefore degrading it.

This should not be confused with perceptual, that is, watermarking which uses the limitations of human perception to be imperceptible.

=== Capacity ===
The length of the embedded message determines two different main classes of digital watermarking schemes:

- The message is conceptually zero-bit long and the system is designed in order to detect the presence or the absence of the watermark in the marked object. This kind of watermarking scheme is usually referred to as zero-bit or presence watermarking schemes.
- The message is an n-bit-long stream $\left(m=m_1\ldots m_n,\; n\in\N\right.$, with $\left.n=|m|\right)$ or $M=\{0,1\}^n$ and is modulated in the watermark. These kinds of schemes usually are referred to as multiple-bit watermarking or non-zero-bit watermarking schemes.

=== Embedding method ===
A digital watermarking method is referred to as spread-spectrum if the marked signal is obtained by an additive modification. Spread-spectrum watermarks are known to be modestly robust, but also to have a low information capacity due to host interference.

A digital watermarking method is said to be of quantization type if the marked signal is obtained by quantization. Quantization watermarks suffer from low robustness, but have a high information capacity due to rejection of host interference.

A digital watermarking method is referred to as amplitude modulation if the marked signal is embedded by additive modification which is similar to spread spectrum method, but is particularly embedded in the spatial domain.

== Evaluation and benchmarking ==
The evaluation of digital watermarking schemes may provide detailed information for a watermark designer or for end-users, therefore, different evaluation strategies exist. Often used by a watermark designer is the evaluation of single properties to show, for example, an improvement. Mostly, end-users are not interested in detailed information. They want to know if a given digital watermarking algorithm may be used for their application scenario, and if so, which parameter sets seems to be the best.

== Cameras ==
Epson and Kodak have produced cameras with security features such as the Epson PhotoPC 3000Z and the Kodak DC-290. Both cameras added irremovable features to the pictures which distorted the original image, making them unacceptable for some applications such as forensic evidence in court. According to Blythe and Fridrich, "[n]either camera can provide an undisputable proof of the image origin or its author". A secure digital camera (SDC) was proposed by Saraju Mohanty, et al. in 2003 and published in January 2004. This was not the first time this was proposed. Blythe and Fridrich also have worked on SDC in 2004 for a digital camera that would use lossless watermarking to embed a biometric identifier together with a cryptographic hash.

== Reversible data hiding ==
Reversible data hiding is a technique which enables images to be authenticated and then restored to their original form by removing the digital watermark and replacing the image data that had been overwritten.

== Watermarking for relational databases ==
Digital watermarking for relational databases has emerged as a candidate solution to provide copyright protection, tamper detection, traitor tracing, and maintaining integrity of relational data. Many watermarking techniques have been proposed in the literature to address these purposes. A survey of the current state-of-the-art and a classification of the different techniques according to their intent, the way they express the watermark, the cover type, granularity level, and verifiability was published in 2010 by Halder et al. in the Journal of Universal Computer Science.

== See also ==
- Audio watermark – Electronic identifier embedded in an audio signal
- Automatic content recognition – Identification technology
- Chip art – Microscopic artwork built into integrated circuits
- Coded Anti-Piracy – Anti-copyright infringement technology
- Copy attack – Computer security exploit
- Digital on-screen graphic – Television station logo used as a watermark
- EURion constellation – Pattern of symbols incorporated into a number of banknote designs
- Pattern Recognition (novel) – 2003 novel by William Gibson
- Printer tracking dots – Digital watermark tracking code produced by many printers
- Steganography – Hiding messages in other messages
- Text watermarking – Technique to mark material as AI-generated
- Traitor tracing – Method of tracing the source of leaked data
- Watermark (data file) – Method used in data files
