= EAC =

EAC may refer to:

== Education ==
- Eastern Arizona College, in Thatcher, Arizona, United States
- Emilio Aguinaldo College, in Manila, Philippines

== Government and politics ==
- East African Community, a trade bloc
- East Asian Community, a proposed trade bloc
- Election Assistance Commission of the Government of the United States
- Electoral Affairs Commission of Hong Kong
- Electricity Authority of Cambodia
- Electricity Authority of Cyprus
- Environmental audit committee of the Parliament of the United Kingdom
- European Advisory Commission, a commission arranged at the 1943 Moscow Conference between the Allies of World War II
- European Asylum Curriculum, a European Union project in the field of asylum

== Medicine ==
- Ehrlich ascites carcinoma
- Erythema annulare centrifugum
- Esophageal adenocarcinoma
- External auditory canal

== Military ==
- Eastern Air Command (India)
- Echelon above corps
- RCAF Eastern Air Command, active during World War II

== Sport ==
- European Archery Championships
- European Athletics Championships
- FAI European Aerobatic Championships

== Technology ==
- EAC-C2C, a submarine telecommunications cable system
- Enhanced Audio Codec
- Exact Audio Copy, a CD ripping software package
- Encoded Archival Context, an XML-based standard
- Extended Access Control, a security feature for e-passports
- Easy Anti-Cheat, a security program for online games

== Organizations and companies ==
- EA Canada, a video game developer
- East Asiatic Company, a Danish transport company
- Ecology Action Centre, a Canadian environmental organization
- Editors' Association of Canada, a professional organization
- Energy Action Coalition, now Power Shift Network, a North American youth environmental organization
- Euro-Atlantic Centre, a Slovak NGO in the field of foreign and security policies
- Europae Archaeologiae Consilium, an association of archaeological heritage authorities
- European Aviation Air Charter, a defunct British airline
- European Air Charter (Bulgarian airline), a Bulgarian charter airline
- European Arboricultural Council, an international forestry agency
- European Astronaut Centre, a training site of the European Space Agency in Cologne, Germany
- European Astronaut Corps, a unit of the European Space Agency

== Other uses ==
- East Australian Current
- Eastern Agricultural Complex, indigenous plants cultivated in the precontact southeastern United States
- Eko Atlantic, a planned city in Lagos State, Nigeria
- Equivalent annual cost
- Euro-American Challenge, an American football game
- Eurasian Conformity mark, a certification mark valid in post-Soviet countries that belong to the Eurasian Customs Union
- Everyone's a Critic, a defunct film community website
- Estimate at completion, in earned value management
- Extend Air Cartridge, a make or type of absorbent canister for a rebreather
