= FVD =

FVD may refer to:

- FVD, an automobile engine made by Cosworth
- Fast Virtual Disk, a disk image file format
- Forum voor Democratie (Forum for Democracy), a Dutch political party
- Forward Versatile Disc, a DVD format
