= Enhanced Versatile Disc =

Chinese optical disc format intended to replace DVD

The Enhanced Versatile Disc (EVD) is an optical-medium-based digital audio/video format, developed by Beijing E-World (a multi-company partnership including SVA, Shinco, Xiaxin, Yuxing, Skyworth, Nintaus, Malata, Changhong, and BBK Electronics), as a rival to the DVD to avoid the high royalty costs associated with the DVD format. Its development was supported by the Chinese government. While it was intended to replace the DVD standard in China by 2008, the format had failed to gain traction and ultimately faded into obsolescence.

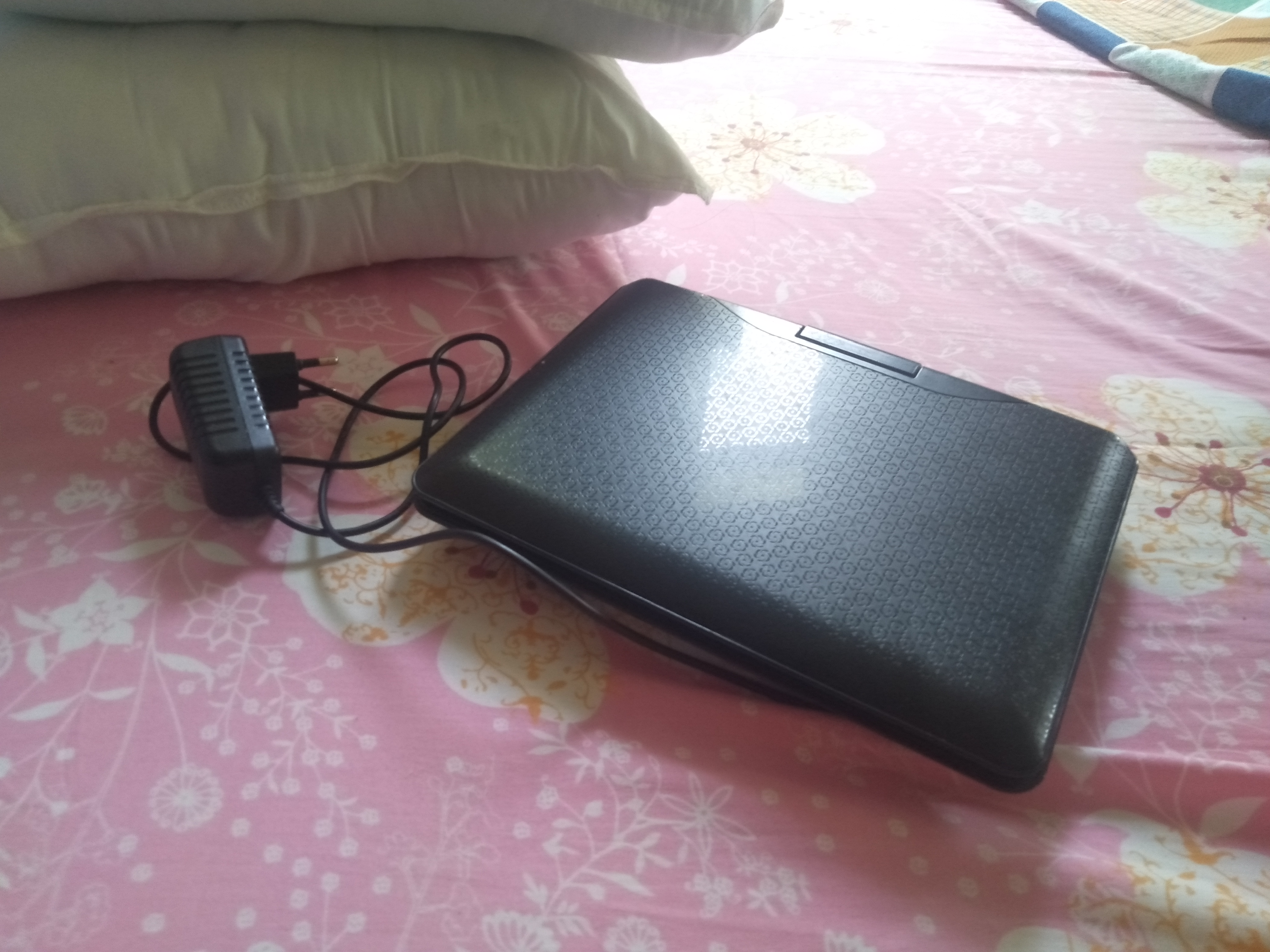
An EVD video player

It was announced on November 18, 2003, by the People's Republic of China's Xinhua News Agency as a response to the DVD-Video format and its licensing costs (which some considered excessive). It uses an optical storage medium in CD size (120 mm) that is physically a DVD disc with the same UDF file system. China started development on EVD in 1999, because DVD Video (CSS, Macrovision, etc.) and MPEG-2 (Video and Systems) licensing costs were relatively high—reportedly in the range of $13–$20 USD per hardware video player. Soon after, Prototype EVD discs and software players were presented in April 2004. As the disc is physically a DVD it could be read with any computer DVD drive. Successful copies were made with DVD-R discs. Despite its versatility, the number of films ever offered in the format was very limited.

The audio codec was to come from Coding Technologies and was called the EAC (Enhanced Audio Codec) 2.0. It is the successor of a prior design known as EAC and works on the basis of spectral band replication. EAC 2.0 supports mono, stereo and 5.1 surround sound. The original plan was that the video codecs VP5 and VP6 from On2 Technologies would be used. These are more efficient than MPEG-2 Video and could enable the disc to store HDTV resolutions, which the standard DVD format does not support. With EVD, royalties to On2 for the VP6 codec part of the EVD design were anticipated to be about US$2 per video player (a much lower fee than that associated with MPEG-2 Video). However, a contract dispute rapidly developed between On2 and Beijing E-World (the consortium of companies developing the EVD format). On2 announced in April 2004 that it was not being properly paid and would file multiple breach of contract claims against E-World for arbitration. Approximately one year later, the arbitrator dismissed all of On2's claims and ruled that nothing was owed to On2, primarily because no significant number of player devices had ever been produced by the E-World companies. While the EVD format design including VP6 had been proposed to the Chinese government to become a standard, the effort appears to have stalled at that point and no further progress is evident. Following this, very little news was available about EVD until December 6, 2006, when 20 Chinese electronic firms unveiled 54 prototype EVD players, announcing their intention to fully switch to this format by 2008 in an effort to decrease dependency on foreign electronic products and establish a niche in the market. While many devices were made, the format failed to replace the DVD standard.

The Chinese government had reported the overcoming of development, chip-design and production problems with EVD. The team had applied for 25 patents, of which at least seven have been granted. While Beijing E-World sought widespread adoption for the EVD, the format has not had any new compatible hardware released since 2008.

== Films released ==
- Black Mask 2: City of Masks (2002)
- Hero (Director's Cut) (2002)
- House of Flying Daggers (2004)

== See also ==
- China Blue High-definition Disc (a follow-on to EVD based on HD-DVD technology)
- China Video Disc (CVD) (a Chinese standard based on VCD)
- Audio Video Standard (a newly created audio/video format designed for use in the EVD standard)
- Theora (based upon On2 Technologies' VP3 codec)
- Competing technologies: Blu-ray Disc, HD DVD (defunct), FVD, HVD
