= China Blue High-definition Disc =

Optical disc format based on HD DVD

CH DVD
- Media type: High-density optical disc
- Developed by: DVD Forum, Optical Memory National Engineering Research Center (OMNERC)
- Usage: Data storage, including high-definition video

China Blue High-Definition (CBHD; Chinese: 中国蓝光高清光盘; alternatively "China High Definition DVD") is a high definition optical disc format announced in September 2007 by the Optical Memory National Engineering Research Center (OMNERC) of Tsinghua University in China.

The format is a derivative of the HD DVD, a medium created by the DVD Forum designed to succeed regular DVDs.

Although HD DVD was scrapped as a result of losing the format war to Blu-ray, CBHDs continued to be produced and marketed, though only in China.

== History ==
Originally called CH-DVD, CBHD was developed by a joint venture between the DVD Forum and OMNERC. Development began in 2005, and an early prototype was demonstrated in 2007. In 2008, during the DVD Forum's 42nd Steering Committee Meeting, the DVD Forum gave OMNERC the permission to edit HD DVD specifications.

Though HD DVD proponents had hoped that CBHD would be a viable successor to the HD DVD format, the CBHD spec was ultimately incompatible with HD DVD players despite the similarities between the two. As a result, CBHD is a proprietary format unique to China.

== Technology ==
Development of CBHD, heavily based on the HD DVD standard, was greatly helped by Japanese engineers. In particular, Hisashi Yamada, former Chief Technology Fellow at Toshiba's Digital Media Network, often referred to as the "father of DVD", has played a key role in China's plan to create its own high-definition consumer video format.

CBHD differs from HD DVD in several key areas. CBHD uses the PRC government-owned AVS video codec, DRA audio codec, and a new copy protection system, DKAA, as an alternative to HD DVD's and Blu-ray's AACS.

CBHD's developers claim the format contains more copy protection features and is part of a big push by China to fight piracy in addition to reducing their reliance upon foreign patents with their associated royalty payments.

CBHD also eschews HD DVD's Advanced Content navigation system in favor of a Chinese system called CETC.

Like HD DVD, CBHD discs have a capacity of 15 GB single-layer and 30GB dual-layer and can utilize existing DVD production lines.

== Industry support ==
In early March 2009, Warner Bros. announced they would be supporting the CBHD format, launching with titles including the Harry Potter series and Blood Diamond, with discs selling for between 50 and 70 yuan (roughly $7.25 to $10.15).

According to an August 2009 television story by TV Tokyo, CBHD was outselling rival Blu-ray by a margin of 3 to 1 in China (due to heavy advertisement and favored backing from the government).

In September 2009, Universal Studios and National Geographic announced their support for the format. Also adding support for the format are Paramount Pictures (US), Celestial (HK/CN) and BBC/Discovery (UK/US).

Six CBHD players were released: four by Shinco (CBHD-9100, CBHD-3800, HD-2100 and HD-3700U) two by TCL (THBD-1008 and THBD-1038). According to reports from the China HD Association, Shinco was selling under 11,000 CBHD players every month between mid-2009 and mid-2010.

== See also ==
- China Video Disc, a Chinese-modified VCD format
- High-Definition Versatile Disc, China's high-resolution format on DVDs
- Blu-ray Disc, an alternative high definition format
- Comparison of high definition optical disc formats
