= Format war =

Competition between proprietary formats in the same market

A format war is a competition between similar but mutually incompatible technical standards that compete for the same market, such as for data storage devices and recording formats for electronic media. It is often characterized by political and financial influence on content publishers by the developers of the technologies. Developing companies may be characterized as engaging in a format war if they actively oppose or avoid interoperable open-industry technical standards in favor of their own.

The emergence of a format war can be explained because each vendor is trying to exploit cross-side network effects in a two-sided market. There is also a social force to stop a format war: when one of them wins as de facto standard, it solves a coordination problem for the format users.

== 19th century ==
- Rail gauge. The Gauge War in Britain pitted the Great Western Railway, which used broad gauge, against other rail companies, which used what would come to be known as standard gauge. Ultimately standard gauge prevailed.
- Similarly, in the United States there was incompatibility between railroads built to the standard gauge and those built to the so-called Russian gauge. During the initial period of railroad building, standard gauge was adopted in most of the northeastern United States, while the wider gauge, later called "Russian", was preferred in most of the southern states. In 1886, the Southern railroads agreed to coordinate changing gauge on all their tracks. By June 1886, all major railroads in North America were using what was effectively the same gauge.
- Direct current vs. alternating current: The 1880s saw the spread of electric lighting with large utilities and manufacturing companies supplying it. The systems initially ran on direct current (DC) and alternating current (AC), with low-voltage DC used for interior lighting and high-voltage DC and AC running very bright exterior arc lighting. With the invention of the AC transformer in the mid 1880s, alternating current could be stepped up in voltage for long range transmission and stepped down again for domestic use, making it a much more efficient transmission standard now directly competing with DC for the indoor lighting market. In the U.S. Thomas Edison's Edison Electric Light Company tried to protect its patent controlled DC market by playing on the public's fears of the dangers of high voltage AC, portraying their main AC competitor, George Westinghouse's Westinghouse Electric Company, as purveyors of an unsafe system, a back and forth financial and propaganda competition that came to be known as the war of the currents, even promoting AC for the Electric chair execution device. AC, with its more economical transmission, would prevail, supplanting DC.
- Musical boxes: Several manufacturers introduced musical boxes that utilised interchangeable steel disks that carried the tune. The principal players were Polyphon, Symphonion (in Europe) and Regina (in the United States). Each manufacturer used its own unique set of disc sizes (which varied depending on the exact model purchased). This assured that once the purchaser had bought a music box, they had to buy the music discs from the same manufacturer.

== 1900s ==
- Player pianos: In stark contrast to almost every other entertainment medium of the 20th century and beyond, a looming format war involving paper roll music for player pianos was averted when industry leaders agreed upon a common format at the Buffalo Convention held in Buffalo, New York in 1908. The agreed-upon format was a roll 11.25 inches (286 mm) wide. This allowed any roll of music to be played in any player piano, regardless of who manufactured it. As the music played, the paper winds onto the lower roll from the upper roll, which means any text or song lyrics printed on the rolls is read from the bottom to the top.

== 1910s ==
- Early recording media formats: cylinder records versus disc records. In 1877 Thomas Edison invented sound recording and reproduction using tinfoil wrapped around a pre-grooved cylinder, and in 1888 he introduced the wax "Edison cylinder" as the standard record format. In the 1890s Emile Berliner began marketing disc records and players. By the late 1890s, cylinders and discs were in competition. Cylinders were more expensive to manufacture and the wax was fragile, but most cylinder players could make recordings. Discs saved space and were cheaper and sturdier, but due to the constant angular velocity (CAV) of their rotation, the sound quality varied noticeably from the groove near the outer edge to the inner portion nearest the center; and disc record players could not make recordings.

== 1920s ==
- Gramophone record formats: lateral versus vertical "hill-and-dale" groove cutting. When Edison introduced his "Diamond Disc" (played with a diamond stylus instead of a steel needle) record in 1912, it was cut "hill-and-dale", meaning that the groove was modulated along its vertical axis, as it had been on all cylinders—unlike other manufacturers' discs, which were cut laterally, meaning that their grooves were of constant depth and modulated along the horizontal axis. Machines designed to play lateral-cut discs could not play vertical-cut ones and vice versa. Pathé Records also adopted the hill-and-dale format for their discs, first issued in 1906, but they used a very wide, shallow groove, played with a small sapphire ball, which was incompatible with Edison products. In 1929, Thomas Edison quit the record industry, ceasing all production of both discs and cylinders. Pathé had been making a transition to the lateral format during the 1920s and in 1932 decisively abandoned the vertical format. There was no standard speed for all disc records until 78 rpm was settled on during the latter half of the 1920s, although because most turntables could be adjusted to run at a fairly wide range of speeds, that did not really constitute a format war. Some Berliner Gramophone discs played at about 60 rpm. Some of Pathé's largest discs, which were 50 cm (nearly 20 inches) in diameter, played at 120 rpm. Diamond Discs were 80 rpm. Those makers aside, speeds in the mid-70s were more usual.

In addition, there were several more minor "format wars" between the various brands using various speeds ranging from 72 to 96 rpm, as well as needle or stylus radii varying from 0.0018 to 0.004 inches (0.046 to 0.102 mm) – the current 0.003-inch (0.076 mm) radius needle or stylus is a compromise, as no company actually used this size. The most common sizes were 0.0028 inches (0.071 mm), used by Columbia, and 0.0032 inches (0.081 mm), used by HMV/Victor.

== 1930s ==
- 240-line versus 405-line television broadcasts. In 1936, the BBC Television Service commenced television broadcasting from Alexandra Palace in North London. They began by using two different television standards, broadcasting in alternate weeks. The 240-line Baird sequential system was broadcast using a mechanical scanning apparatus. In the intervening weeks, EMI-Marconi broadcast in 405-line interlaced using fully electronic cameras. Early sets had to support both systems, adding to their complexity. It was the BBC's intention to run the two systems side by side for a six-month trial to determine which would be finally adopted. The BBC quickly discovered that the fully electronic EMI system had a superior picture quality and less flicker, and the camera equipment was much more mobile and transportable (Baird's intermediate-film cameras had to be bolted to the studio floor as they required a water supply and drainage). The trial concluded after only three months, after Baird's studios had lost most of their equipment in a fire.

== 1940s ==
- Vinyl records: Columbia Records' Long Play (LP) 33⅓ rpm microgroove record (introduced in 1948) versus RCA Victor's 7-inch (18 cm) 45 rpm record, from 1949 (the introduction of the latter) into c. 1951. The battle ended because each format found a separate marketing niche (LP for classical music recordings, 45 for the pop "singles" market) and most new record players were capable of playing both types.
- The National Television System Committee (NTSC) was formed to settle the existing format incompatibility between the original 441 scan line RCA system and systems designed by the DuMont Television Network and Philco. In March 1941 the committee issued its plan for what is now known as NTSC, which has been the standard for television signals in the United States and most countries influenced by the U.S. until the adoption of digital and HD television formats with the official adoption of ATSC on June 12, 2009.

== 1950s ==
- The National Television System Committee (NTSC) was reconvened in January 1950 to decide on a revision to its original format to allow for color broadcasting. There were competitive format options offered by the Columbia Broadcasting System that were not downwardly compatible with the existing NTSC format.
- In the early 1950s, 12-volt electric systems were introduced to automobiles in an effort to provide more starting power for big engines, which were getting popular at the time, while reducing the current. Six-volt systems were still popular since they were commonplace prior to the decade. However, 12-volt systems became the de facto standard.

== 1960s ==
- Portable audio formats: 8-track and 4-track cartridges vs. Compact Cassette, vs the lesser known DC-International tape cassette (introduced by Grundig). While rather successful into the mid-to-late 1970s, the 8-track eventually lost out due to technical limitations, including variable audio quality and inability to be rewound. Similarly the smaller formats of microcassette, developed by Olympus, and minicassette, developed by Philips, were manufactured for applications requiring lower audio fidelity such as dictation and telephone answering machines.
- FM radio stereo broadcast formats: The Crosby system and the GE/Zenith system. The Crosby system was technically superior, especially in transmitting clear stereo signals, due to its use of an FM subcarrier for stereo sound rather than the AM subcarrier employed by GE/Zenith. Many radios built in this period allowed the user to select Crosby or GE/Zenith listening modes. However, the Crosby system was incompatible with the more lucrative SCA services such as in-store broadcasting and background music. FM station owners successfully lobbied the FCC to adopt the GE/Zenith system in 1961, which was SCA-compatible.

== 1970s ==
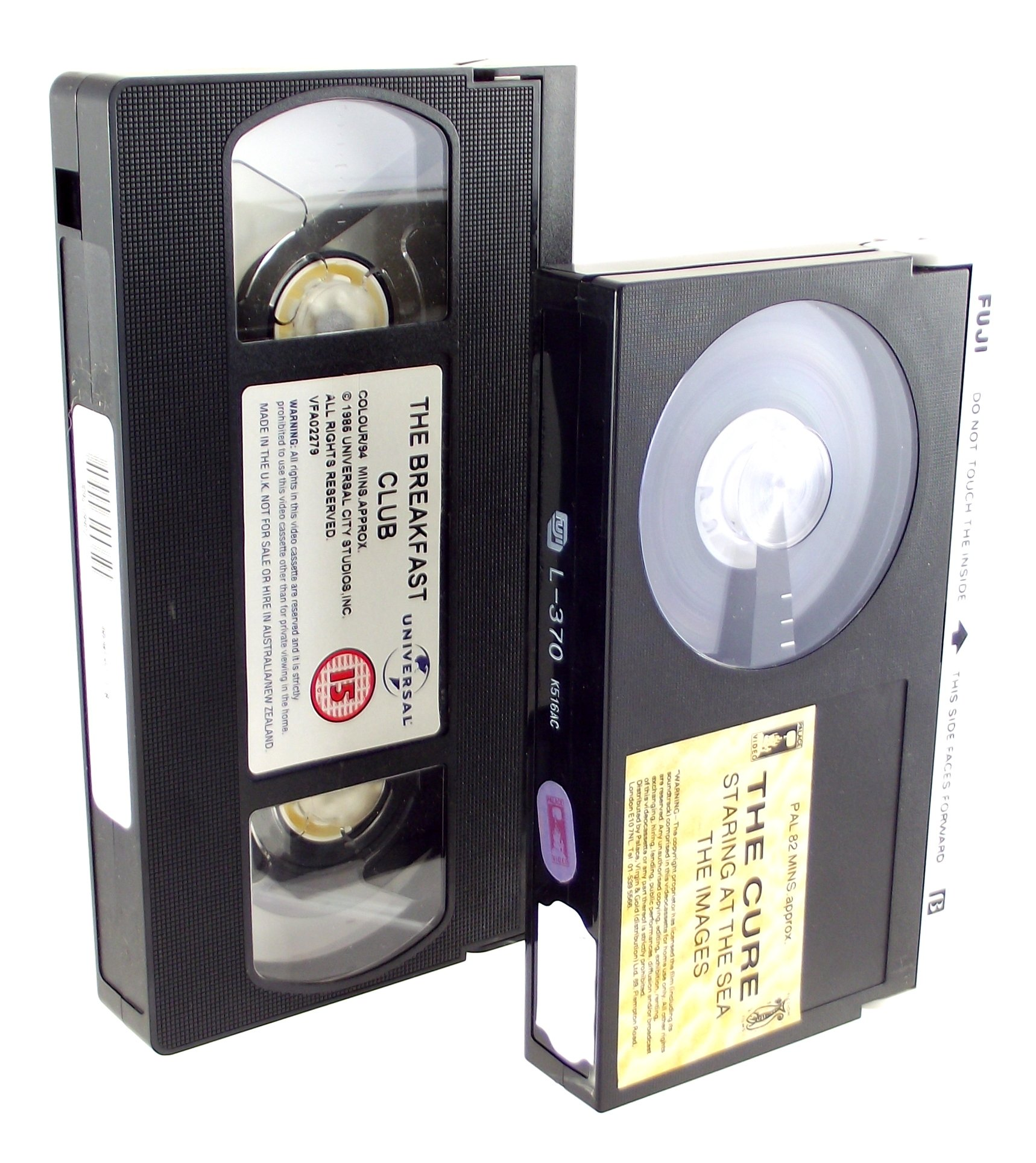
VHS and Betamax tapes

- Quadraphonic encoding methods: CD-4, SQ, QS-Matrix, and others. The expense (and speaker placement troubles) of quadraphonic, coupled with the competing formats requiring various demodulators and decoders, led to an early demise of quadraphonic, though 8-track tape experienced a temporary boost from the introduction of the Q8 form of 8-track cartridge. Quadraphonic sound returned in the 1990s substantially updated as surround sound, but was incompatible with old hardware.
- Analog videotape formats: VHS vs. Betamax vs. Video 2000. The competition started in 1976 and by 1980, VHS controlled 70% of the North American market. VHS's main advantage was its longer recording time. From the consumer perspective, VHS blank media held more hours and therefore was less expensive.
- Reel-to-reel video formats: The first small format video recording devices were open reel-to-reel 1/2" "portable" EIAJ-1 recorders, most of which came with television tuners to record TV broadcasts. These never caught on in the consumer market but did find their way into educational television and were the mainstays of early public-access television stations. The uniformity of the EIAJ-1 format was the result of a developmental format war between Sony and Panasonic, each of whom were aiming at this market. The existence of the Electronic Industries Association of Japan (EIAJ) was the Japanese electronics industry's answer to some potential format wars.
- Analog videodisc formats: Capacitance Electronic Disc (CED) vs. LaserDisc (LD) vs. VHD (Video High-Density). All ultimately failed to achieve widespread acceptance, although LD found a considerable videophile niche market that appreciated its high-quality image, chapter select and widescreen presentation. The LaserDisc remained available until the DVD arrived. Mainstream consumers preferred the recordable videotape for capturing broadcast television and making home movies, and made VHS the de facto standard video format for almost 20 years (circa 1982 to 2002).

== 1980s ==
- Home computers often had incompatible peripherals such as joysticks, printers, or data recording (tape or disk). For example, if a Commodore 64 user wanted a printer, they would need to buy a Commodore-compatible unit, or else risk not being able to plug the printer into their computer. Similarly, disk formats were not interchangeable without third party software since each manufacturer (Atari, IBM, Apple, et al.) used their own proprietary format. Gradually computer and game systems standardized on the Atari joystick port for joysticks and mice (during the 1980s), parallel port for printers (mid-1980s), the MS-DOS-derived FAT12 format for floppy disks (mid-1990s), and so on.
- AM stereo was capable of fidelity equivalent to FM but was doomed in the United States by competing formats during the 1980s, with Motorola's C-QUAM competing vigorously with three other incompatible formats, including those by Magnavox, Kahn/Hazeltine, and Harris. It is still widely used in Japan, and sees sporadic use by broadcast stations in the United States despite the lack of consumer equipment to support it.
- Video8 vs. VHS-C and later Hi8 vs. S-VHS-C tape formats (see camcorder). This is an extension of the VHS vs. Betamax format war, but here neither format "won" widespread acceptance. Video8 had the advantage in terms of recording time (4 hours versus 2 hours maximum), but consumers also liked VHS-C since it could easily play in their home VCRs; thus the two formats essentially split the camcorder market in half. Both formats were superseded by digital systems by 2011.
- Microfloppy disk: Throughout the early 1980s, the limitations of the 5¼-inch floppy disk format were starting to become clear. A number of intended successors were developed, with drives at 2-inch, 2½-inch, 3-inch and 3½-inch (50, 60, 75 and 90 mm), all being offered by various companies, leading to a format war. In 1982, the Microfloppy Industry Committee (MIC) was formed, eventually growing to a consortium of 23 system, drive and media manufacturers. In January 1983 they agreed on a design based on Sony's 3½-inch drive and media specification introduced earlier in 1980, but with the same speed and interface as then-standard 5¼-inch drives.
- Several different versions of the Quarter Inch Cartridge used for data backup.
- Micro Channel Architecture (MCA) vs. Extended Industry Standard Architecture (EISA). Up to the introduction of MCA, personal computers had relied on a 16-bit expansion system, which was later christened 'Industry Standard Architecture' (ISA). IBM introduced a new range of personal computers featuring a new 32-bit expansion system, which they called MCA. It was at this point that the rest of the personal computer industry named the existing expansion system ISA. IBM wanted substantial royalties from any manufacturer wishing to adopt the MCA system (largely in an attempt to recover lost royalties that they believed they were owed due to the wholesale cloning of their original PC, a task that was greatly simplified by the off-the-shelf nature of the design). IBM's competitors jointly responded by introducing the EISA expansion system, which, unlike MCA, was fully compatible with the existing ISA cards. Eventually, neither MCA nor EISA really caught on, and the PCI standard was adopted instead.
- Home computer sound cards: Ad Lib vs. Roland MT-32 vs. Sound Blaster

== 1990s ==
- Philips' Digital Compact Cassette (DCC) vs. Sony's MiniDisc (MD): both introduced in 1992. Since affordable CD-R was not available until about 1996, DCC and MD were an attempt to bring CD-quality recording to the home consumer. Restrictions by record companies fearful of perfect digital copies had limited an earlier digital system (DAT) to professional use. In response, Sony introduced the MiniDisc format, which provided a copy control system that seemed to allay record companies' fears. Philips introduced their DCC system around the same time using the same copy control system. Philips' DCC was discontinued in 1996, but MD successfully captured the Asia Pacific market (e.g. Japan, Hong Kong, Singapore, etc.) and initially did well in parts of Europe. The consumers in other parts of the world chose neither format, preferring to stick with analog Compact Cassettes for home audio recording, and eventually upgrading to now affordable CD recordable discs and lossy-compressed MP3 formats. Production of MiniDisc systems finally ceased in 2013, however, Sony continued to produce blank discs in Japan until February 2025.
- Rockwell X2 vs K56flex – In the race to achieve faster telephone line modem speeds from the then-standard 9.6 kbit/s, many companies developed proprietary formats such as V.32 Turbo (19.2 kbit/s) or TurboPEP (23.0 kbit/s) or V.FAST (28.8 kbit/s), hoping to gain an edge on the competition. The X2 and K56flex formats were a continuation of that ongoing battle for market dominance until the V.90 standard was developed in 1999. For some time, online providers needed to maintain two modem banks to provide dial-up access for both technologies. (See "modem" for a complete history.)
- Medium-capacity removable magnetic media drives, with several incompatible formats—a small market of write-once optical drives (requiring the use of a protective, plastic jacket) and several more successful but also incompatible magnetic read-write cassette drives. The Iomega Zip format ultimately prevailed, with capacities of 100 and 250 megabytes, plus the rather less popular 750 MB system; but these media and their drives were quickly supplanted by the much slower but far cheaper recordable compact disc CD-R (early models use a caddy to ensure proper alignment and help protect the disc). The CD-R has the advantage of existing wide industry standards support (the Red Book CD-DA standard for audio discs and the Yellow Book CD-ROM standard for data read-only CD), with the low-level recording format based upon the popular and low-cost read-only compact disc used for audio and data. Sony tried to establish "MD Data" Discs as an alternative, based on their MiniDisc R&D, with two computer peripherals: MDH-10 and MDM-111.
- External bus transfer protocols: IEEE 1394 (FireWire) vs. USB. The proliferation of both standards has led to the inclusion of redundant hardware adapters in many computers, unnecessary versioning of external hardware, etc. FireWire has been marginalized to high-throughput media devices (such as high-definition video camera equipment) and legacy hardware.
- 3D graphics APIs: DirectX vs. OpenGL vs. Glide API. In the latter half of the 1990s, as 3D graphics became more common and popular, several video formats were promoted by different vendors. The proliferation of standards (each having many versions with frequent and significant changes) led to great complexity, redundancy, and frustrating hardware and software compatibility issues. 3D graphics applications (such as games) attempted to support a variety of APIs with varying results or simply supported only a single API. Moreover, the complexity of the emerging graphics pipeline (display adapter -> display adapter driver -> 3D graphics API -> application) led to a great number of incompatibilities, leading to unstable, underperforming, or simply inoperative software. Glide eventually dropped out of the war due to the only manufacturer supporting it — that is, 3dfx — ceasing production of their video cards.
- Video disc formats: MMCD versus SD. In the early 1990s, two high-density optical storage standards were being developed: one was the MultiMedia Compact Disc (MMCD), backed by Philips and Sony, and the other was the Super Density disc (SD), supported by Toshiba, Matsushita and many others. MMCD was optionally double-layered while SD was optionally double-sided. Movie studio support was split. This format war was settled before either went to market by unifying the two formats. Following pressure by IBM, Philips and Sony abandoned their MMCD format and agreed upon the SD format with one modification based on MMCD technology, viz. EFMPlus. The unified disc format, which included both dual-layer and double-sided options, was called DVD and was introduced in Japan in 1996 and in the rest of the world in 1997.
- More video disc formats: Video CD versus the DVD. While the MMCD and SD war was going on, Philips developed their own video format called the Video CD. While the format quickly flopped in the U.S., in Europe and Japan the battle waged on fiercely, as the VideoCD's lower production cost (and thus sales price) versus the DVD's superior audiovisual quality and multimedia experience resulted in a split market audience, with one end wanting cheap media without minding the lower quality and multimedia richness, while the other willing to pay a premium for the better experience DVD offered. The battle was settled by the movie industry who rapidly refused to issue any more VCD discs once CD recorders became available. Unlike DVD, the VCD format had no copy protection mechanism whatsoever.
- Digital video formats: DVD versus DIVX (not to be confused with DivX). DIVX was a rental scheme where the end consumer would purchase a $2–3 disc similar to DVD but could only view the disc for 48 hours after the first use, similar to another rental scheme, Flexplay. Each subsequent view would require a phone line connection to purchase another $2–3 rental period. Several Hollywood studios (Disney, 20th Century Fox, and Paramount Pictures) initially released their movies exclusively in the DIVX format. However, video rental services found the multi-use DVD more attractive, and videophiles who collected films rejected the idea of a pay-per-view disc.

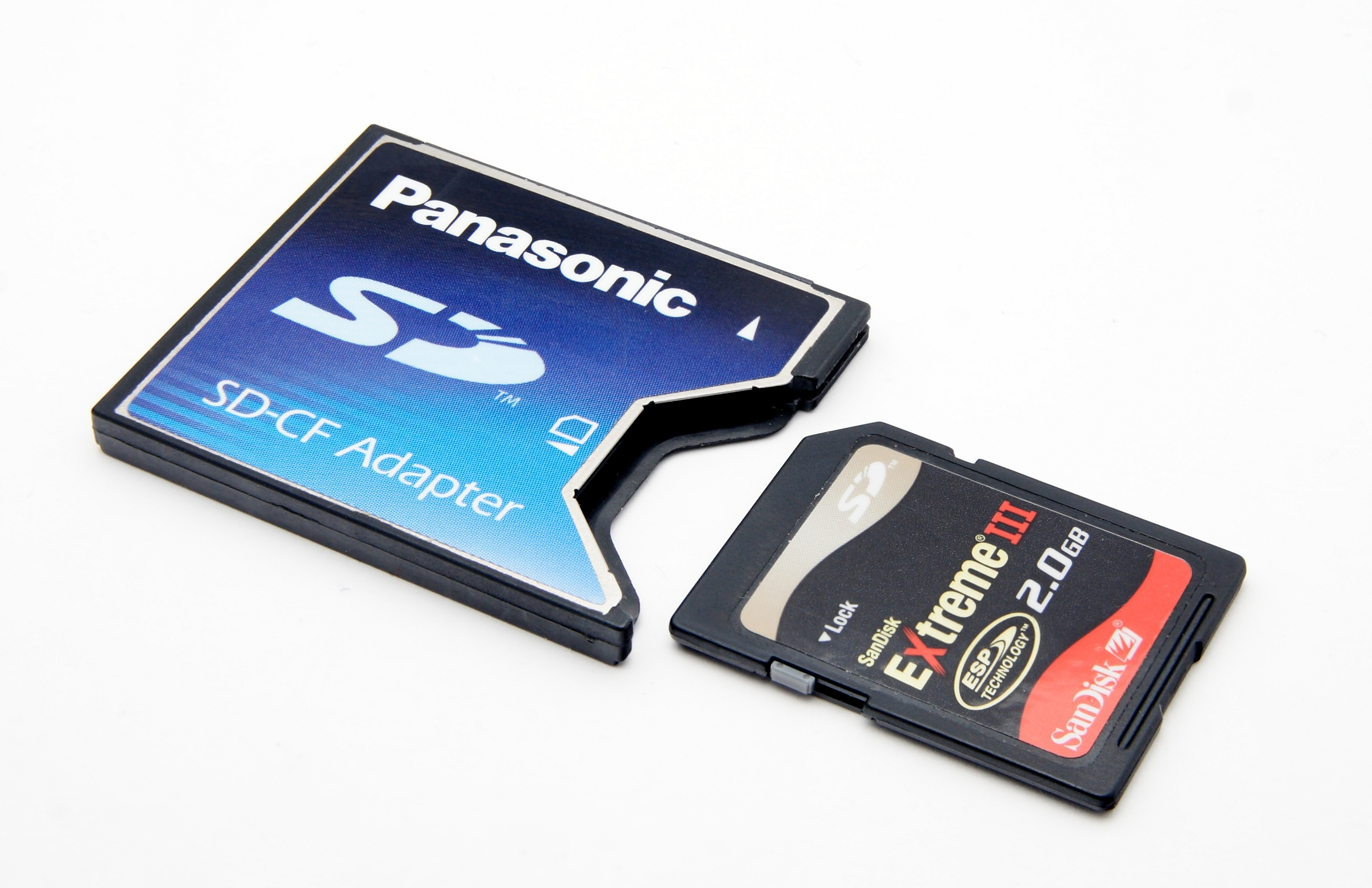
Adapter for SD card to CompactFlash

- Memory cards, with several implementations: CompactFlash, CFast, CFexpress, Memory Stick, Miniature Card, MultiMediaCard, SD card, SmartMedia, xD-Picture Card, and XQD card. SD cards have become the dominant consumer electronics format, adopted by most major manufacturers that once backed competing standards—such as Sony (Memory Stick) and Olympus and Fujifilm (xD-Picture Card). However, the format war is not entirely settled. CFexpress remains in use for high-end photography alongside SD card, leaving the professional market somewhat fragmented, while other formats have been largely abandoned or relegated to niche roles.
- Hi-fi digital audio discs: DVD-Audio versus SACD. These discs offered all the advantages of a CD but with higher audio quality. The players and discs were reverse compatible (the new Hi-fi players could play most 12 cm optical disc formats) but listening to the newer formats required a hardware upgrade. SACD was acclaimed by Sony marketers as offering slightly better technical quality through its new PDM "bitstream" system and a greater number of SACD titles available. However, the two formats continue to coexist due to "hybrid" players that play both formats with equal ease. Neither DVD-Audio nor SACD won a significant percentage of the recorded audio market. A significant reason was the customer preference for easy-to-transport lossy compressed formats such as MP3 and AAC. In 2013, music companies led by Universal Music Group have launched Blu-ray Discs with high-resolution PCM audio, branded as High Fidelity Pure Audio, as an alternative format with the same objectives.
- Television auxiliary video inputs: Composite video vs. S-video. Composite video inputs had more widespread support since they used the ubiquitous RCA connector previously used only with audio devices, but S-video used a 4-pin DIN connector exclusively for the video bus.
- Wireless communication standards: Through the late 1990s, proponents of Bluetooth (such as Sony-Ericsson) and Wi-Fi competed to gain support for positioning one of these standards as the de facto computer-to-computer wireless communication protocol. This competition ended around 2000 with Wi-Fi the undisputed winner (largely due to a very slow rollout of Bluetooth networking products). However, in the early 2000s, Bluetooth was repurposed as a device-to-computer wireless communication standard and has succeeded well in this regard. Today's computers often feature separate equipment for both types of wireless communication, and both are ubiquitous in modern smartphones.
- Disk image formats for capturing digital versions of removable computer media (particularly CD-ROMs and DVD-ROMs): ISO vs. CUE/BIN vs. NRG vs. MDS vs. DAA, etc. Although the details of capturing images are complex (e.g., the oddities of various copy protection technologies applied to removable media), image formats have proliferated beyond reason - mainly because producers of image-creating software often like to create a new format with touted properties in order to bolster market share.
- Streaming media formats: AVI, QuickTime (MOV), Windows Media (WMV), RealMedia (RA), Liquid Audio, MPEG, DivX, XviD, and a large host of other streaming media formats cropped up, particularly during the internet boom of the late 1990s. The wildly large number of formats is very redundant and leads to a large number of software and hardware incompatibilities (e.g., a large number of competing rendering pipelines are typically implemented in web browsers and portable video players.)
- Single-serve coffee containers: Major players include Nestlé’s Nespresso which started in 1976, but became popular in the late 1990s and was later joined by Senseo, Caffitaly, Keurig and Tassimo. These systems were created to give out a single serving of fresh ground coffee through a capsule. By the end of the 2010s, as the patents on the original systems expired, allowing rival companies to make cheaper capsules, Nespresso came out on top in most of the world, but Keurig dominated the North American market.

== 2000s ==
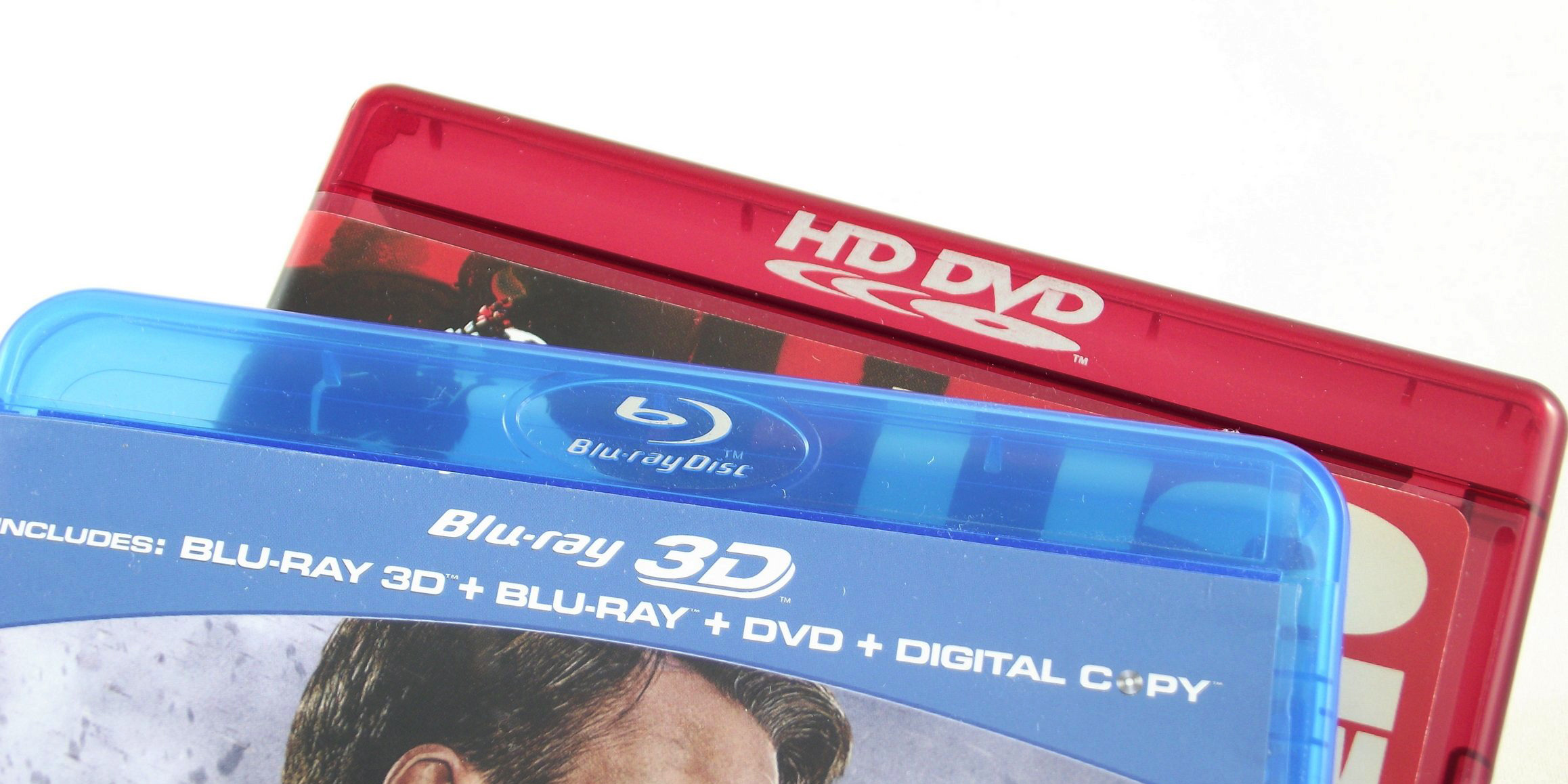
HD DVD and Blu-ray cases

- Recordable DVD formats: DVD+R versus DVD-R. Since practically all PC based DVD drives and most new DVD recorders support both formats (designated as DVD±R recorders), the 'war' was made effectively moot.
- Digital audio data compression formats: MP3 versus Ogg Vorbis versus MPEG4 Advanced Audio Coding versus HE-AAC/AACplus versus Windows Media Audio codecs versus Free Lossless Audio Codec (FLAC). Each format has found its own niche — MPEG1 audio layer 3, abbreviated MP3, was developed for audio encoding of the DVD and has remained a de facto standard for audio encoding. A technically better compression technique, MPEG4 (more commonly known as AAC) was subsequently developed and found favor with most commercial music distributors. The addition of Spectral Band Replication (AACplus or HE-AAC) allows the format to recreate high-frequency components/harmonics missing from other compressed music. Vorbis is most commonly used by game developers who have a need for high-quality audio, do not want to pay the licensing fees attached to other codecs, and do not need existing compatibility and name recognition of MP3. FLAC, a lossless format, emerged later and has become accepted by audiophiles. Consumer outcry against software incompatibility has prompted portable music player manufacturers such as Apple and Creative to support multiple formats.
- High-definition optical disc formats: Blu-ray versus HD DVD. Several disc formats that were intended to improve on the performance of the DVD were developed, including Sony's Blu-ray and Toshiba's HD DVD, as well as HVD, FVD and VMD. The first HD-DVD player was released in March 2006, followed quickly by a Blu-ray player in June 2006. In addition to the home video standalone players for each format, Sony's PlayStation 3 video game console offers a Blu-ray disc playback and its games use that format as well. The format war went largely in Blu-ray's favor after the largest movie studio supporting HD DVD, Warner Bros., decided to abandon releasing films on HD-DVD in January 2008. Later in 2008, Toshiba decided to abandon the format too. Shortly thereafter, several major North American rental services and retailers such as Netflix, Best Buy, Walmart, etc. and disc manufacturers such as CMC Magnetics, Ritek, Anwell, and others, announced the exclusive support for Blu-ray products, ending the format war.
- Ultra-wideband networking technology — in early 2006, an IEEE standards working group disbanded because two factions could not agree on a single standard for a successor to Wi-Fi. (WiMedia Alliance, IEEE 802.15, WirelessHD)
- Automotive interfaces for charging mobile devices: cigar lighter receptacles delivered 12 volts DC and USB 5 volts. The 5-volt system derived from PC data buses, while the 12-volt system derived from the automobile's electrical system. The popularity of cigar-lighter-to-USB adapters for charging cell phones is what led to this movement, and later automobiles were equipped with both (sometimes with USB on the car radio faceplate).

== 2010s ==
- Digital video: H.264 and H.265 (patented standards that require royalty payments) versus royalty-free alternatives like VP8, VP9, and Theora that attempt to avoid patent infringement.
- 4G wireless broadband WiMAX versus LTE Advanced.
- Power-line communication as an alternative to Wi-Fi or wired Ethernet for broadband home networking (LAN) purposes: IEEE 1901, branded as HomePlug AV/AV2 and commercially marketed by networking hardware brands such as Devolo, D-Link, TP-Link and Zyxel, vs. the more recent, but similar ITU standard G.hn promoted by some major Internet service providers and hardware manufacturers part of the HomeGrid Forum trade association.
- Premium large format (PLF) cinema: IMAX versus Dolby Cinema versus Barco Escape versus China Film Giant Screen versus RPX versus Extra Experience versus UltraAVX.
- Virtual reality headsets: Oculus Rift using Oculus' OVR API vs. HTC Vive and Valve's SteamVR.
- Universal charger: USB is an industry standard that allows data exchange and delivery of power between many types of electronics. USB-C has become a widespread standard for charging mobile phones, even defeating Apple's Lightning.
- Wireless charging standard: Qi from Wireless Power Consortium versus WiPower from The Alliance for Wireless Power
- Web browser plugin API: NPAPI versus PPAPI, championed by Google, which announced it was dropping NPAPI support from Chrome on September 1, 2015.
- Combined Charging System (Europe, Americas, South Korea) versus CHAdeMO (Japanese standard) versus GB/T (Chinese standard) versus North American Charging Standard (NACS) (Tesla) quick charging methods for battery electric vehicles.
- Home automation: Wi-Fi vs Bluetooth vs Zigbee vs Z-Wave vs Thread (network protocol) for networking protocols used by hardware. There is also the Software framework battle between Amazon Alexa, Google Home (platform), Apple Home, and the open-source Home Assistant, however the software battle eventually led to the creation of Matter (standard) to avoid incompatibility.
- The ITU-R Recommendation BT.2020 had defined 10 bits for each color channel for the future 8K UHDTV in 2012. Dolby developed an extension for Dolby Cinema in 2014 where the new Dolby Vision format has a 12-bit color depth per channel. Dolby Vision is not royalty free, so Samsung developed an alternative HDR10+ format for HDR video in 2017. Its rival LG does support Dolby Vision. With widespread availability of HDR television during 2018 it can be seen that products supporting Dolby Vision do also allow HDR10+ as input.
- Modern surround sound standards (formats with object tracks): Dolby Atmos vs DTS:X vs MPEG-H 3D Audio vs Auro-3D vs Sony 360 Reality Audio
- Digital radio standards: Digital mobile radio vs Project 25 vs TETRA, NXDN as well as some Amateur radio-only variants such as D-STAR and Yaesu System Fusion

== 2020s ==
- Decentralized social media: ActivityPub vs AT Protocol vs Nostr
- Next generation image format: AVIF vs HEIC vs JPEG XL
- Decentralized chat: Matrix protocol vs XMPP vs SimpleX Chat vs Mattermost

== See also ==
- Browser wars
- Console war
- Editor war
- High-definition optical disc format war
- Not invented here
- Protocol Wars
- Total Hi Def
- Vendor lock-in
