= High-definition optical disc format war =

Format war from 2006 to 2008 between Blu-ray and HD DVD

Blu-ray Disc logo

HD-DVD logo

The high-definition optical disc format war was a market competition between two optical disc standards for distributing high-definition video: Blu-ray Disc, backed by Sony, and HD DVD, backed by Toshiba. The conflict lasted from 2006 to 2008 and concluded with Blu-ray emerging as the dominant format. Both formats were developed in the early 2000s as successors to the DVD, utilizing blue laser technology to increase data storage capacity. Although they employed similar technology, Blu-ray offered higher capacity, while HD DVD benefited from lower manufacturing costs due to its compatibility with existing DVD production infrastructure.

The competition echoed the earlier videotape format war between VHS and Betamax, with hardware manufacturers, movie studios, and retailers divided in their support. Consumer hesitation over which format would prevail contributed to sluggish adoption of both. Blu-ray's eventual dominance was tempered by the rise of digital streaming services during the late-2000s and 2010s, which quickly became a popular alternative to physical media.

Two key factors contributed to Blu-ray's victory: Sony's inclusion of a Blu-ray drive in the PlayStation 3 video game console, which rapidly expanded the installed user base, and the subsequent shift in support from major movie studios and retailers toward Blu-ray. On February 19, 2008, Toshiba officially announced that it would cease development of HD DVD players, effectively conceding the format war.

== Background ==
The high-definition optical disc format war echoed the earlier videotape format war between VHS and Betamax, in which Sony also played a key role. Historically, format wars have often proved destructive to both camps because consumers, afraid of committing to a losing standard, refrain from purchasing either. In the decades since the videotape format war, similar battles had been avoided by industry associations that created a unified standard, including the DVD Forum for the DVD standard and the Grand Alliance for the HDTV standard.

The demand for high-definition content grew in the mid-2000s alongside the widespread adoption of HDTVs. A higher-capacity optical storage medium was needed to support the data requirements of HD video. A breakthrough came with Shuji Nakamura’s invention of the blue laser diode, which had a shorter wavelength, enabling more compact data encoding compared to the red laser used in DVDs.

Sony started two projects applying blue-laser technology: Ultra Density Optical and, in collaboration with Pioneer, DVR Blue. The latter was publicly demonstrated at CEATEC in October 2000, and was later developed into Blu-ray, which was officially announced on February 19, 2002, and supported by the Blu-ray Disc Association (BDA), a consortium of nine electronics manufacturers.

Meanwhile, the DVD Forum, chaired by Toshiba, was deeply split over adopting the blue laser technology, with concerns centered around the expensive diodes and the cost of caddies, which were needed to protect early prototype discs. Instead, in March 2002, the forum approved a plan to compress HD content onto dual-layer DVD-9 discs. However, Toshiba and NEC continued to develop their own blue-laser format, initially branded as Advanced Optical Disc, which would be adopted by the DVD Forum as "HD DVD" in 2003. However, the approval only came after being voted down twice by BDA-aligned members, which prompted the HD DVD promoters to add three new members to the DVD Forum and change its voting rules to secure approval. These efforts led to scrutiny by the U.S. Department of Justice.

== Attempts to avoid a format war ==
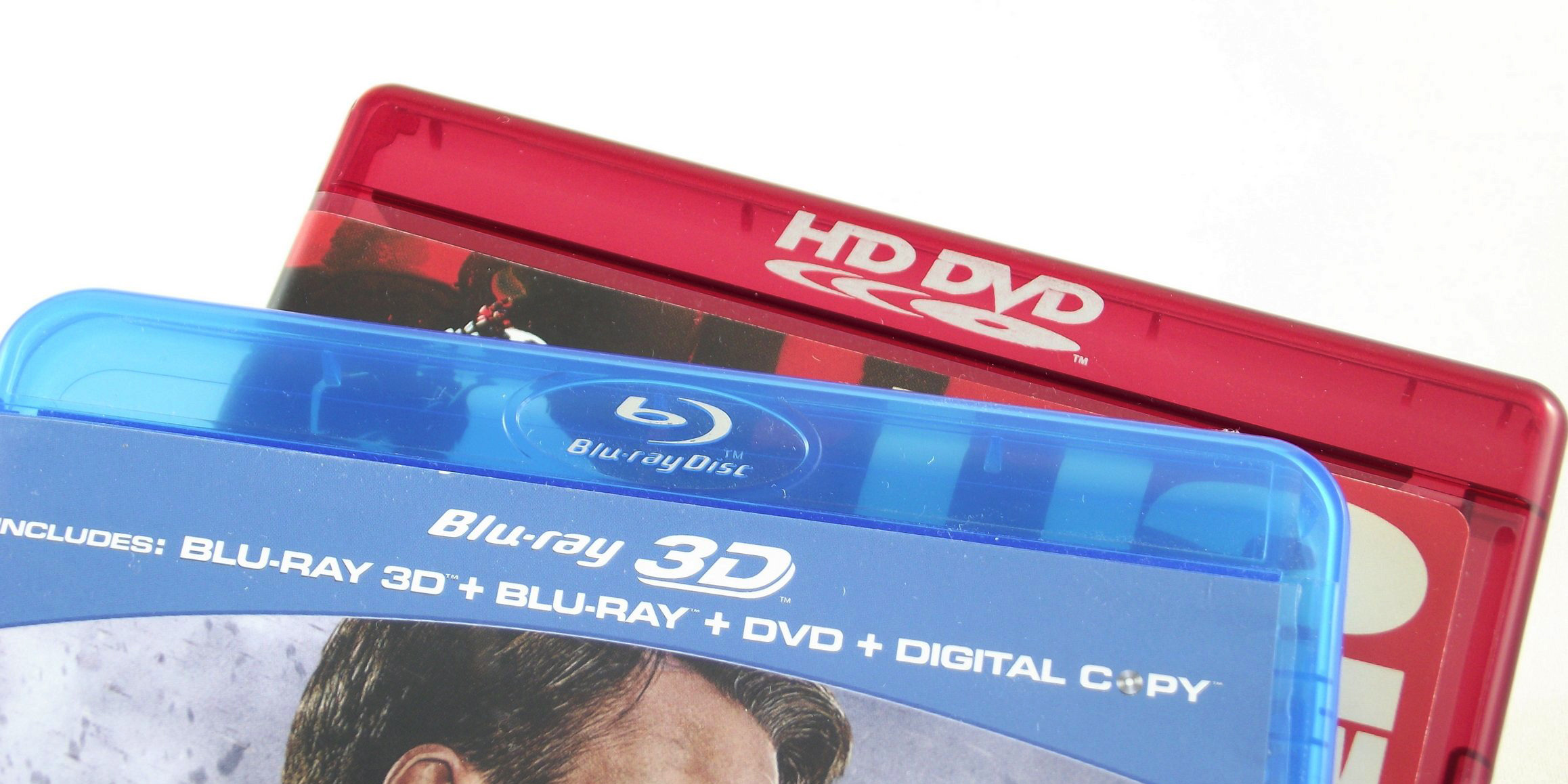
HD DVD (top) and Blu-ray (bottom) used near-identical translucent keep cases, normally colored red for HD DVD and blue for Blu-ray.

In early 2005, the BDA and the DVD Forum initiated negotiations to unify their competing formats in hopes of avoiding a costly format war. One of the major technical disagreements involved the interactivity platform: Blu-ray supporters advocated for a Java-based system known as BD-J, while the DVD Forum backed Microsoft's HDi. However, a larger point of contention was that companies within the BDA were concerned about losing billions in potential royalties as they had under the DVD licensing model. Although an agreement appeared within reach at various points, progress was slow.

Talks appeared to break down around mid-2005. In June, Sun Microsystems, the developer of Java, announced that the BDA had officially adopted BD-J over HDi. Around the same time, Microsoft and Toshiba revealed plans to collaborate on HD DVD player development. In an effort to change the minds of the BDA members, in July Microsoft's Bill Gates argued that HDi would "work more smoothly with personal computers". However BDA representatives ultimately stood by their choice of BD-J.

On August 22, 2005, the BDA and DVD Forum announced that the negotiations to unify their standards had failed.

Hewlett-Packard (HP) proposed a compromise in October: if the BDA adopted HDi and a mandatory "managed copy" feature, HP would support Blu-ray. At the time, analysts suggested that if HP’s demands were met, Blu-ray would win the format war before it even started. Although the BDA agreed to implement managed copy, it again declined to adopt HDi.

HD DVD players and titles launched in the United States on April 18, 2006, while Blu-ray titles followed on June 20, 2006.

== Alliances ==
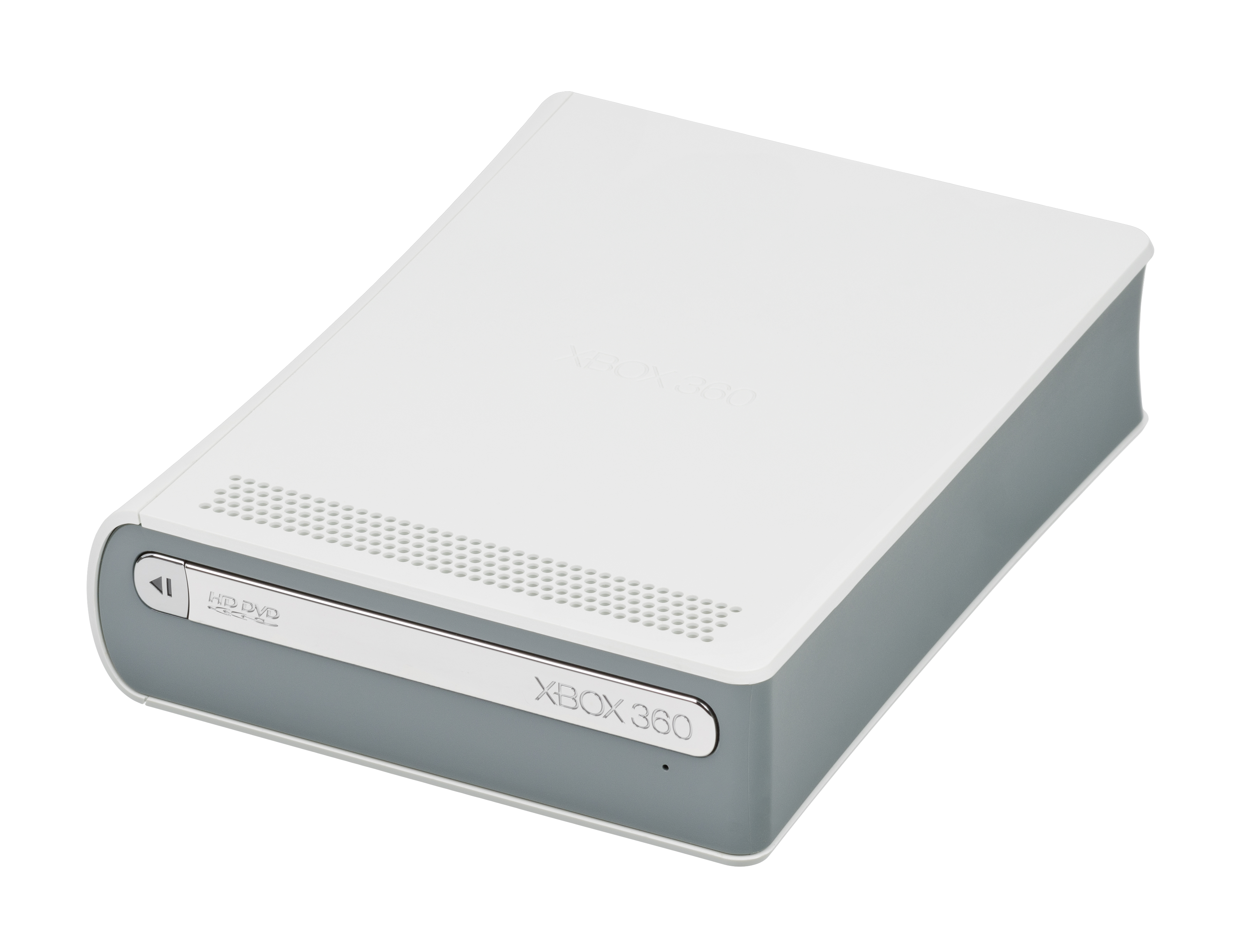
Microsoft released an HD DVD drive for the Xbox 360 for movie playback, but never published games in the format.

The BDA traces its origins to the Blu-ray Disc Foundation, which was formed on May 20, 2002, by major electronics companies including Hitachi, LG, Panasonic, Pioneer, Philips, Samsung, Sharp, Sony, and Thomson. Additional early supporters included Dell, HP, Mitsubishi, and TDK. The BDA was officially founded on October 4, 2004, with 14 companies, now including 20th Century Fox. The association ultimately grew to encompass 73 member companies, contributors, and general members. Non-exclusive Blu-ray supporters included Acer, Alpine, Asus, Hitachi Maxell, Kenwood, Lanix, Lite-On, Meridian, Onkyo, and Samsung.

The HD DVD Promotion Group was formed by Toshiba, NEC, Sanyo, and Memory-Tech Corporation on September 27, 2004. Additional early supporters included Microsoft, RCA, Intel, and Venturer Electronics.

During the height of the format war, several studios released content on both Blu-ray and HD DVD. These included Paramount, BBC, First Look, Image Entertainment (including programming from the Discovery Channel), Magnolia, BCI Eclipse, Ryko and Koch Vision.

== Deciding factors ==
The format war's resolution in favor of Blu-ray was primarily decided by two factors: Sony's inclusion of a Blu-ray drive in the PlayStation 3 video game console, which rapidly expanded the installed user base; and the shift in business alliances by major film studios and the subsequent reaction of retail distributors.

=== PlayStation 3 ===
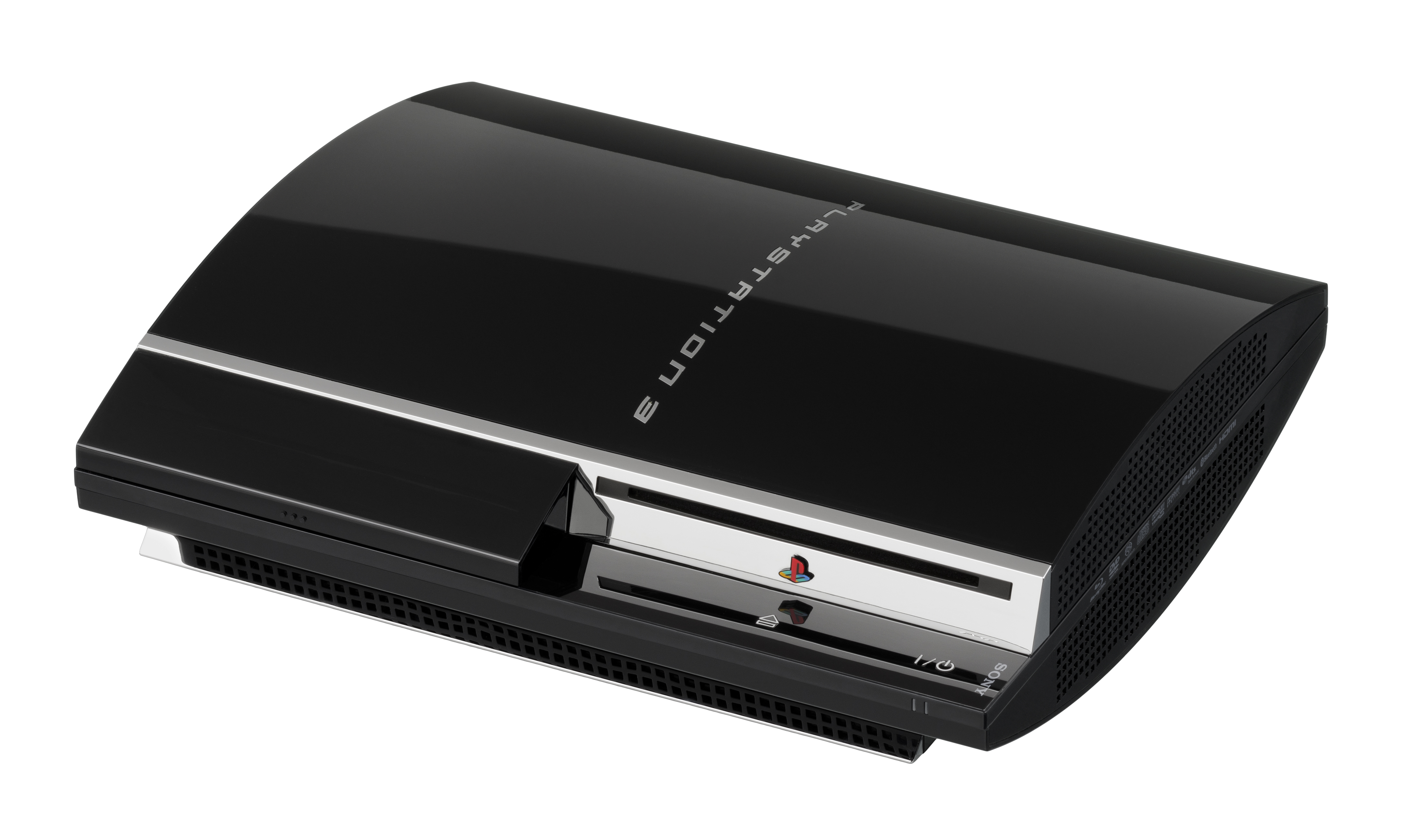
Sony's PlayStation 3 incorporated a Blu-ray Disc player as a standard feature

Sony's decision to incorporate a Blu-ray Disc player as a standard feature of the PlayStation 3 video game console helped ensure the format's eventual triumph. By the time Toshiba ceded the market, about 10.5 million of the Sony consoles had been sold worldwide versus an estimated 1 million HD DVD players—including both standalone units and the external HD DVD drive for Microsoft's Xbox 360 console. Unlike the Xbox 360, which did not use HD DVD for games, the PlayStation 3 supported games on Blu-ray discs, taking advantage of the format’s increased storage capacity.

This disparity in installed user base contributed to Blu-ray titles (including those bundled with the PS3) outselling HD DVD counterparts by a ratio of two to one in the United States, and by as much as three or four to one in Europe.

Sony's strategy came at a significant cost. The PlayStation 3 initially launched at a retail price starting at US$500—roughly double that of the PlayStation 2 and substantially higher than competing consoles. However, the console was estimated to cost more than US$800 to manufacture, resulting in a loss of around US$300 per unit, largely due to high component costs including the Blu-ray drive, which alone was estimated at US$125. Sony later acknowledged cumulative losses of approximately US$3.3 billion on PS3 hardware through mid-2008. These losses were gradually offset through game sales, licensing fees paid to the BDA, and increased sales of Sony's high-definition televisions.

=== Studio, distributor alliances ===
Studio alliances shifted over time. Prior to the October 2005 launch of either format, both had secured exclusive support from three of the major film studios. HD DVD was backed by Universal, Paramount, and Warner Bros., while Blu-ray had the support of Sony, Disney, and Fox.

Retail momentum quickly shifted toward Blu-ray, in part due to its larger installed base influenced by the PlayStation 3. In June 2007, Blockbuster—then the largest U.S. movie rental chain—announced it would stock only Blu-ray titles. This decision followed a test in 250 stores, where over 70 percent of high-definition rentals were Blu-ray. The next month, Target began carrying only Blu-ray players in its stores.

In August 2007, Paramount and DreamWorks Animation (which was distributed by Paramount) pledged exclusive support for HD DVD. The companies publicly cited HD DVD’s technical advantages and lower production costs for the move. However, reports later revealed they had received a combined US$150 million in financial incentives and marketing commitments from Toshiba.

On January 4, 2008, Warner Bros. declared it would drop HD DVD entirely by June. Toshiba expressed disappointment but vowed to continue supporting the format. Days later, it slashed HD DVD player prices by 40 to 50 percent in an aggressive bid to revive demand. Wall Street analyst Roger Kay likened the move to "doubling down" in a high-stakes gamble to win back market share and the studios, Richard Greenfield dismissed the strategy as a short-term gimmick, and Hiroyuki Shimizu warned that without Warner Bros., HD DVD’s limited library would ultimately prove fatal.

Following Warner's defection, retailer support for HD DVD rapidly collapsed. On January 28, 2008, UK retailer Woolworths announced it would stop selling HD DVD titles in its 820 stores by March. On February 11, U.S. electronics retailer Best Buy began recommending Blu-ray as the preferred format. That same day, Netflix—the largest online video rental service—announced it would phase out its HD DVD inventory, having offered both formats since 2006. Five days later, on February 16, Walmart—the largest retailer in the U.S.—declared it would cease HD DVD sales by June. The New York Times responded with a mock obituary for the format, quoting analyst Rob Enderle: “If Walmart says HD DVD is done, you can take that as a fact".

== AVS Forum shutdown ==
In November 2007, the popular audio-visual discussion site AVS Forum temporarily closed its HD-DVD and Blu-ray discussion forums because of, as the site reported, "physical threats that have involved police and possible legal action" between advocates of the rival formats.

== Toshiba announcement and aftermath ==
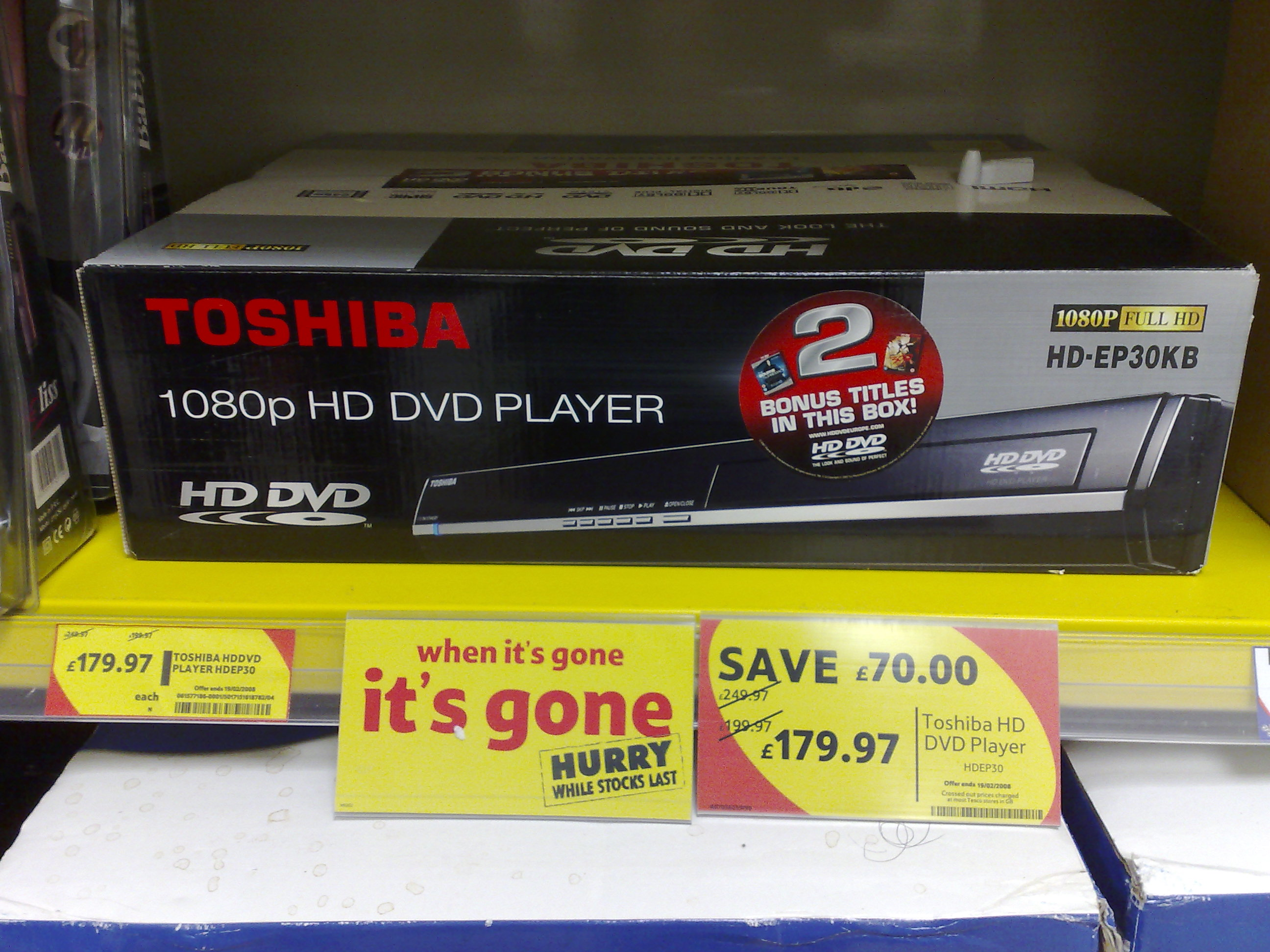
HD DVD player deeply discounted in 2008

On February 19, 2008, Toshiba announced it would cease development, manufacturing, and marketing of HD DVD players. That same day, Universal announced it would release its titles in the Blu-ray Disc format, following two years of exclusive HD DVD support. The next day, on February 20, Paramount also announced support for Blu-ray, becoming the last major studio to do so.

In April 2009, Warner Bros. offered a "Red2Blu" trade-in program, allowing customers to exchange up to 25 HD DVD titles for Blu-ray equivalents, charging only shipping and handling.

Microsoft ended production of its HD DVD add-on for the Xbox 360 and began exploring alternative uses for its HDi and VC-1 technologies, the latter of which was already used in Blu-ray titles from Warner Bros. Although the Xbox 360 never received a Blu-ray drive, its successor, the Xbox One, included built-in Blu-ray drive for both games and movies.

Toshiba’s withdrawal did not immediately lead to a surge in Blu-ray player sales. According to NPD Group, stand-alone Blu-ray sales rose only 2 percent from February to March 2008 after a 40 percent drop the previous month. Upconverting DVD players saw a 5 percent increase in the first quarter of 2008 compared to the same period in 2007, and were significantly cheaper—around US$70 versus US$300 for Blu-ray players. However, by spring 2009, Blu-ray adoption had accelerated. Adams Media Research reported that player sales nearly doubled year-over-year, with 9 million units sold from January to March 2009, up from 4.8 million in the same period of 2008. As of April 2008, the number of Blu-ray households—including both stand-alone players and PlayStation 3 consoles—was estimated at 10.5 million.

== See also ==
- Comparison of high-definition optical disc formats
- De facto standard
- Dominant design
- Videotape format war
