= EACS =

EACS may refer to:

- East African Community Summit, summits of the intergovernmental East African Community
- East Allen County Schools, a public schools district in Indiana, United States
- Electric Air Control System, a fuel system for Suzuki motorbikes
- European AIDS Clinical Society, a Brussels-based non-profit that provides clinical recommendations for care across Europe
- European Association for Chinese Studies, a Paris-based international scholarly association

== See also ==
- EAC
