= U-Control =

U-Control can refer to:

- "U-Control", Universal Studios own HDi Interactive Format template for the interactive technology used in HD DVD movies, later ported to the BD-J format for use in Blu-ray movies.
- Control line (also called "U-Control" in some countries), a way for an operator for controlling a flying model aircraft via pair of wires from the ground.
