= Comparison of high-definition optical disc formats =

Comparison of optical properties and physical layout of various optical storage media

This article compares the technical specifications of multiple high-definition formats, including the now obsolete HD DVD and still in-use Blu-ray Disc; two mutually incompatible, high-definition optical disc formats that, beginning in 2006, attempted to improve upon and eventually replace the DVD standard. The two formats remained in a format war until February 19, 2008, when Toshiba, HD DVD's creator, announced plans to cease development, manufacturing and marketing of HD DVD players and recorders.

Other high-definition optical disc formats were attempted, including the multi-layered red-laser Versatile Multilayer Disc and a Chinese-made format called EVD. Both appear to have been abandoned by their respective developers.

== Technical details ==
Comparison of the high-definition optical media formats DVD included for comparison Mandatory codecs must be supported by the player. Each disc must use one or more of the mandatory codecs.
			Ultra HD Blu-ray	Blu-ray Disc	HD DVD	CBHD (CH-DVD)	AVCHD	AVCREC	DVD
Laser wavelength			405 nm (blue-violet laser)				405 or 650 nm	650 nm (red laser)	
Numerical aperture				0.85	0.65		0.85 or 0.6	0.6	
Storage capacity (single side)		per layer/maximum	33/100 GB	25(50)/128 GB^{[a]}	15/30 GB^{[a]}		1.4/2.6 GB (8 cm DVD), 4.7/8.5 GB (12 cm DVD), 25/50 GB (12 cm BD)	4.7/8.5 GB	
Maximum bitrate	Raw data transfer		144 Mbit/s	53.95 Mbit/s	36.55 Mbit/s		Unknown		11.08 Mbit/s
Maximum bitrate	Audio+Video+Subtitles			48.0 Mbit/s	30.24 Mbit/s		27 Mbit/s		10.08 Mbit/s
Maximum bitrate	Video		128 Mbit/s	40.0 Mbit/s	29.4 Mbit/s		Unknown		9.8 Mbit/s
Mandatory video codecs			H.265/MPEG-H Part 2 / H.264 (for 1080p video only)	H.264/MPEG-4 AVC / VC-1 / MPEG-2		China's AVS / H.264/MPEG-4 AVC / VC-1 / MPEG-2	H.264/MPEG-4 AVC	H.264/MPEG-4 AVC; MPEG-2	MPEG-1 / MPEG-2
Audio codecs (maximum data rates shown)	lossy	Dolby Digital	TBD	Mandatory; 640 kbit/s	Mandatory; 504 kbit/s		Mandatory; 64-640 kbit/s		Mandatory; 448 kbit/s
Audio codecs (maximum data rates shown)	lossy	DTS	TBD	Mandatory; 1.5 Mbit/s		Unknown	—N/a		Optional; 1.5 Mbit/s
Audio codecs (maximum data rates shown)	lossy	Dolby Digital Plus^{[d]}	TBD	Optional; 1.7 Mbit/s	Mandatory; 3.0 Mbit/s		—N/a		—N/a
Audio codecs (maximum data rates shown)	lossy	DTS-HD High Resolution	TBD	Optional; 6.0 Mbit/s	Optional; 3.0 Mbit/s	Unknown	—N/a		—N/a
Audio codecs (maximum data rates shown)	lossless	Linear PCM^{[h]}	TBD	Mandatory			Optional	—N/a	Mandatory
Audio codecs (maximum data rates shown)	lossless	Dolby TrueHD^{[h]}	TBD	Optional; 18 Mbit/s	Mandatory; 18 Mbit/s		—N/a		—N/a
Audio codecs (maximum data rates shown)	lossless	DTS-HD Master Audio^{[h]}	TBD	Optional; 24.5 Mbit/s	Optional; 18 Mbit/s	Unknown	—N/a		—N/a
Secondary video decoder (PiP)			TBD	Mandatory for Bonus View players^{[c]}	Mandatory	Unknown	Unknown		—N/a
Secondary audio decoder			TBD	Mandatory for Bonus View players^{[c]}	Mandatory	Unknown	Unknown		Optional
Interactivity			TBD	BDMV and Blu-ray Disc Java	Standard Content and Advanced Content	CETC	Rudimentary		
Internet support			TBD	Mandatory for BD-Live players	Mandatory	Unknown	—N/a		
Video resolution (maximum)			4K UHD 3840×2160	1920×1080p					720×480 (NTSC); 720×576 (PAL)
Frame rates at maximum resolution			HFR 60p	24/25/30p, 50/60i^{[g]}	24/25/30p, 50/60i		24/25/30p, 50/60i	Unknown	24/25/30p^{[g]} 50/60i
Dynamic range video			HDR10 / HDR10+ / SL-HDR2 / Dolby Vision	SDR	SDR	SDR	SDR	SDR	SDR
Color space			Rec. 2020 / Rec. 709	Rec. 709 / Rec. 601	Rec. 709 / Rec. 601	Unknown	Rec. 709 / Rec. 601	Rec. 709 / Rec. 601	Rec. 601
Digital rights management				AACS-128bit / BD+ / ROM-Mark	AACS-128bit	AACS-128bit / DKAA	None (Not intended for prerecorded content)		CSS 40-bit
Region codes			None	Three region codes^{[f]}	None	Unknown	None		8 regions (6 commercial)
Hardcoating of disc			TBD	Mandatory	Optional				

a These maximum storage capacities apply to currently released media as of January 2012. First two layers of Blu-ray have a 25 GB capacity, but the triple layer disc adds a further 50 GB making 100 GB total. The fourth layer adds a further 28 GB.
b All HD DVD players are required to decode the two primary channels (left and right) of any Dolby TrueHD track; however, every Toshiba made stand-alone HD DVD player released thus far decodes 5.1 channels of TrueHD.
c On November 1, 2007 Secondary video and audio decoder became mandatory for new Blu-ray Disc players when the Bonus View requirement came into effect. However, players introduced to the market before this date can continue to be sold without Bonus View.
d There are some differences in the implementation of Dolby Digital Plus (DD+) on the two formats. On Blu-ray Disc, DD+ can only be used to extend a primary Dolby Digital (DD) 5.1 audiotrack. In this method 640 kbit/s is allocated to the primary DD 5.1 audiotrack (which is independently playable on players that do not support DD+), and up to 1 Mbit/s is allocated for the DD+ extension. The DD+ extension is used to replace the rear channels of the DD track with higher fidelity versions, along with adding additional channels for 6.1/7.1 audiotracks. On HD DVD, DD+ is used to encode all channels (up to 7.1), and no legacy DD track is required since all HD DVD players are required to decode DD+.
e On PAL DVDs, 24 frame per second content is stored as 50 interlaced frames per second and gets replayed 4% faster. This process can be reversed to retrieve the original 24 frame per second content. On NTSC DVDs, 24 frame per second content is stored as 60 interlaced frames per second using a process called 3:2 pulldown, which if done properly can also be reversed.
f As of July 2008, about 66.7% of Blu-ray discs are region free and 33.3% use region codes.
g DVD supports any valid MPEG-2 refresh rate as long as it is packaged with metadata converting it to 576i50 or 480i60, This metadata takes the form of REPEAT_FIRST_FIELD instructions embedded in the MPEG-2 stream itself, and is a part of the MPEG-2 standard. HD DVD is the only high-def disc format that can decode 1080p25 while Blu-ray and HD DVD can both decode 1080p24 and 1080p30. 1080p25 content can only be presented on Blu-ray as 1080i50.
h Linear PCM is the only lossless audio codec that is mandatory for both HD DVD and Blu-ray disc players, only HD DVD players are required to decode two lossless sound formats and those are Linear PCM and Dolby TrueHD. Dolby TrueHD and DTS-HD Master Audio have become sound format of choice for many studios on their Blu-ray titles but ever since Blu-ray won the format war, it has not become clear if they are now Mandatory for all new Blu-ray disc players since the end of the format war.

=== Capacity/codecs ===
Blu-ray Disc has a higher maximum disc capacity than HD DVD (50 GB vs. 30 GB for a double layered disc). In September 2007 the DVD Forum approved a preliminary specification for the triple-layer 51 GB HD DVD (ROM only) disc though Toshiba never stated whether it was compatible with existing HD DVD players. In September 2006 TDK announced a prototype Blu-ray Disc with a capacity of 200GB. TDK was also the first to develop a Blu-ray prototype with a capacity of 100GB in May 2005. In October 2007 Hitachi developed a Blu-ray prototype with a capacity of 100GB. Hitachi has stated that current Blu-ray drives would only require a few firmware updates in order to play the disc.

The first 50 GB dual-layer Blu-ray Disc release was the movie Click, which was released on October 10, 2006. As of July 2008, over 95% of Blu-ray movies/games are published on 50 GB dual layer discs with the remainder on 25 GB discs. 85% of HD DVD movies are published on 30 GB dual layer discs, with the remainder on 15 GB discs.

The choice of video compression technology (codec) complicates any comparison of the formats. Blu-ray Disc and HD DVD both support the same three video compression standards: MPEG-2, VC-1 and AVC, each of which exhibits different bitrate/noise-ratio curves, visual impairments/artifacts, and encoder maturity. Initial Blu-ray Disc titles often used MPEG-2 video, which requires the highest average bitrate and thus the most space, to match the picture quality of the other two video codecs. As of July 2008 over 70% of Blu-ray Disc titles have been authored with the newer compression standards: AVC and VC-1. HD DVD titles have used VC-1 and AVC almost exclusively since the format's introduction. Warner Bros., which used to release movies in both formats prior to June 1, 2007, often used the same encode (with VC-1 codec) for both Blu-ray Disc and HD DVD, with identical results. In contrast, Paramount used different encodings: initially MPEG-2 for early Blu-ray Disc releases, VC-1 for early HD DVD releases, and eventually AVC for both formats.

Whilst the two formats support similar audio codecs, their usage varies. Most titles released on the Blu-ray format include Dolby Digital tracks for each language in the region, a DTS-HD Master Audio track for all 20th Century Fox and Sony Pictures and many upcoming Universal titles, Dolby TrueHD for Disney and Sony Pictures and some Paramount and Warner titles, and for many Blu-ray titles a Linear PCM track for the primary language. On the other hand, most titles released on the HD DVD format include Dolby Digital Plus tracks for each language in the region, and some also include a Dolby TrueHD track for the primary language.

=== Interactivity ===
Both Blu-ray Disc and HD DVD have two main options for interactivity (on-screen menus, bonus features, etc.).

HD DVD's Standard Content is a minor change from standard DVD's subpicture technology, while Blu-ray's BDMV is completely new. This makes transitioning from standard DVD to Standard Content HD DVD relatively simple —for example, Apple's DVD Studio Pro has supported authoring Standard Content since version 4.0.3. For more advanced interactivity Blu-ray disc supports BD-J while HD DVD supports Advanced Content.

=== Disc construction ===
Blu-ray Discs contain their data relatively close to the surface (less than 0.1 mm) which combined with the smaller spot size presents a problem when the surface is scratched as data would be destroyed. To overcome this, TDK, Sony, and Panasonic each have developed a proprietary scratch resistant surface coating. TDK trademarked theirs as Durabis, which has withstood direct abrasion by steel wool and marring with markers in tests.

HD DVD uses traditional material and has the same scratch and surface characteristics of a regular DVD. The data is at the same depth (0.6 mm) as DVD as to minimize damage from scratching. As with DVD the construction of the HD DVD allows for a second side of either HD DVD or DVD.

A study performed by Home Media Magazine (August 5, 2007) concluded that HD DVDs and Blu-ray discs are essentially equal in production cost. Quotes from several disc manufacturers for 25,000 units of HD DVDs and Blu-rays revealed a price differential of only 5-10 cents. (Lowest price: 90 cents versus 100 cents. Highest price: $1.45 versus $1.50.) Another study performed by Wesley Tech (February 9, 2007) arrived at a similar conclusion. Quotes for 10,000 discs show that a 15 gigabyte HD DVD costs $11,500 total, and 25 gigabyte Blu-ray or a 30 gigabyte HD DVD costs $13,000 total. For larger quantities of 100,000 units, the 30 gigabyte HD DVD was more expensive than the 25 gigabyte Blu-ray ($1.55 versus $1.49).

While there is a HD-DVD variant that acts as a successor for the DVD-RAM, the HD DVD-RAM, a "BD-RAM" has never been released. Although the BD-RE has unrestricted random writing access capabilities, its rewrite cycle count of around 1000 times is much lower than the potential 100,000 rewrite cycles of some DVD-RAM variants.

=== Hybrid discs ===
At the Consumer Electronics Show, on 4 January 2007, Warner Bros. introduced a hybrid technology, Total HD, which would reportedly support both formats on a single disc. The new discs were to overlay the Blu-ray and HD DVD layers, placing them respectively 0.1 millimetres (100 μm) and 0.5 millimetres (500 μm) beneath the surface. The Blu-ray top layer would act as a two-way mirror, reflecting just enough light for a Blu-ray reader to read and an HD DVD player to ignore.

Later that year, however, in September 2007, Warner President Ron Sanders said that the technology was on hold due to Warner being the only company who would publish on it.

One year after the original announcement, on 4 January 2008, Warner Bros. stated that it would support the Blu-ray format exclusively beginning on 1 June 2008, which, along with the demise of HD DVD the following month, ended development of hybrid discs permanently.

=== Copy protection ===
The primary copy protection system used on both formats is the Advanced Access Content System (AACS). Other copy protection systems include:

Blu-ray Disc	HD DVD
HDCP encrypted digital output; ROM-Mark watermarking technology (physical layer); BD dynamic crypto (BD+); Cinavia Digital Mark	HDCP encrypted digital output

=== Region coding ===
The Blu-ray specification and all currently available players support region coding. As of July 2008 about 66.7% of Blu-ray Disc titles are region-free and 33.3% use region codes.

The HD DVD specification had no region coding, so a HD DVD from anywhere in the world will work in any player. The DVD Forum's steering committee discussed a request from Disney to add it, but many of the 20 companies on the committee actively opposed it.

Some film titles that were exclusive to Blu-ray in the United States such as Sony's xXx, Fox's Fantastic Four: Rise of the Silver Surfer and The Prestige, were released on HD DVD in other countries due to different distribution agreements; for example, The Prestige was released outside the U.S. by once format-neutral studio Warner Bros. Pictures. Since HD DVDs had no region coding, there are no restrictions playing foreign-bought HD DVDs in an HD DVD player.
