= IHD =

IHD can mean:

- Ischemic heart disease
- Intermittent hemodialysis
- iHD Interactive Format
- Human Rights Association (Turkey), Turkish, İnsan Hakları Derneği
- Index of Hydrogen Deficiency
- In-home device, a home energy monitor
