= Videotape format war =

Period of competition

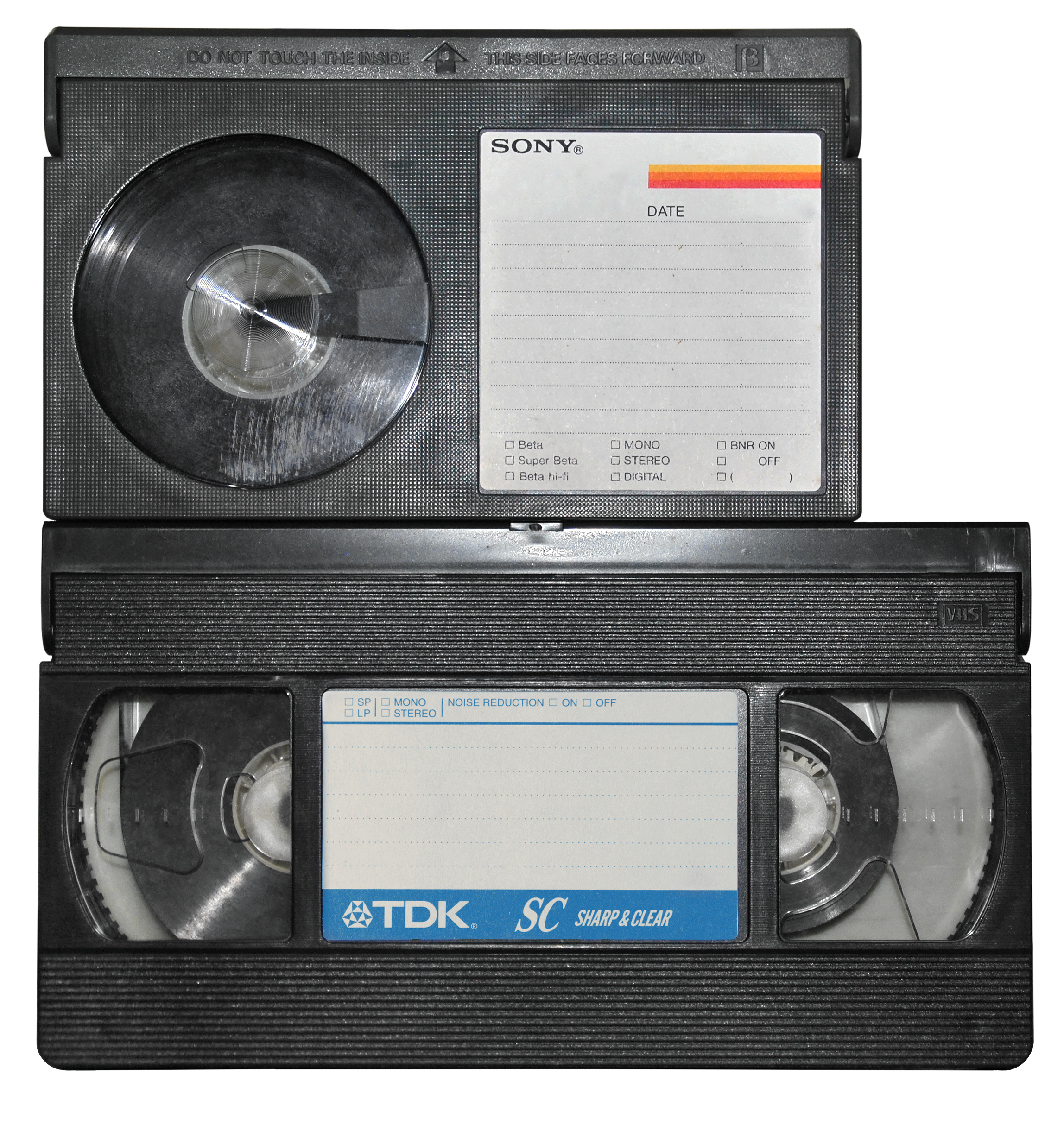
Size comparison between a Betamax cassette (top) and a VHS cassette (bottom)

The videotape format war was a period of competition or "format war" of incompatible models of consumer-level analog videocassette formats and video cassette recorders (VCRs) in the late 1970s and the 1980s, mainly involving the Betamax and VHS (Video Home System) formats. VHS ultimately emerged as the preeminent format.

== History ==
EVR's lead is being challenged by a cluster of rivals. Philips and Sony have devised a player using magnetic tape rather than film. Decca and Telefunken prefer plastic discs (not unlike refined long-playing records), while RCA's Selectavision uses a laser beam to imprint images on vinyl tape. The only trouble is that none of the rival systems are compatible: an EVR cartridge will not function on a Sony or a Decca player.

— Timothy Green, 1972

Sony had demonstrated a prototype videotape recording system it called "Beta" to the other electronics manufacturers in 1974, and expected that they would back a single format for the good of all. But JVC in particular decided to go with its own format.

Manufacturers also introduced other systems such as needle-based, record-style discs (RCA's Capacitance Electronic Disc, JVC's Video High Density disc) and optical discs (Philips/MCA/Pioneer's LaserDisc). None of these disc formats gained much ground as none was capable of home recording; however, they did hold small niche markets.

Some sources say that VHS won over Betamax due to the greater availability of pornographic movies on the format. In the 1980s, the founder of Vivid Entertainment said "we pushed VHS harder, and in that sense we did have something to do with VHS winning out". Steve Duplessie, the founder of research firm Enterprise Strategy Group, disagreed, saying that VHS won over Betamax due to its more open format.

== Competing technologies ==
Sony had met with executives from Matsushita (now Panasonic) in late 1974 and early 1975 to discuss the forthcoming home video market. Soon after, RCA met with executives from JVC, at the time a Matsushita subsidiary, who had created another video format, VHS. JVC refused to compromise the picture quality of their format by allowing a four-hour mode. Matsushita later met with RCA and agreed to manufacture a four-hour-capable VHS machine for RCA.

=== Picture quality ===
When Betamax was introduced in Japan and the United States in 1975, its Beta I speed of 1.57 inches per second (ips; 4 cm/s) offered a higher horizontal resolution (approximately 250 lines vs 240 lines horizontal NTSC), lower video noise, and less luma/chroma crosstalk than VHS, and was later marketed as providing pictures superior to VHS's playback. However, the introduction of Beta II speed, 0.79 ips (2 cm/s; two-hour mode), to compete with VHS's two-hour Standard Play mode (1.31 ips/3.33 cm/s) reduced Betamax's horizontal resolution to 240 lines.

=== Outcome ===
Although Betamax initially owned 100% of the market in 1975 (as VHS did not launch until the following year) the perceived value of longer recording times eventually tipped the balance in favor of VHS. By 1980, VHS had proven favorable among consumers and was successful in controlling 60% of the North American market. By 1981, sales of Beta machines in the United States had sunk to 25% of the VCR market. As movie studios, video studios, and video rental stores turned away from Betamax, the combination of lower market share and a lack of available titles further weakened Betamax's position. In the United Kingdom Beta held a 25% market share, but by 1986 it was down to 7.5% and continued to decline further. In Japan, Betamax had more success, but VHS was still the market leader. By 1987, VHS accounted for 90% of the VCR market in the United States. In 1988, Videofax magazine declared that Beta had lost the format war after Sony agreed to start adding VHS to the company's VCR lineup.

Both Betamax and VHS were supplanted by high-definition optical discs. The last Sony Betamax unit was produced in 2002, while the last VCR/DVD combo unit was produced in 2016.

== Contributing factors ==
What Sony did not take into account was what consumers wanted. While Betamax was believed to be the superior format in the minds of the public and press (due to excellent marketing by Sony), consumers wanted an affordable VCR (which often cost hundreds of dollars less than a Betamax player); Korean electronic manufacturers, such as Samsung and GoldStar (now LG Electronics), responded to Funai, Shintom, and Orion Electric for the availability of video cassette players (VCP) to movie rental stores, by offering first VHS VCR prices down to under $200 by 1986. Sony believed that having better quality recordings was the key to success, and that consumers would be willing to pay a higher retail price for this, whereas it soon became clear that consumer desire was focused more intently on recording time, lower retail price, compatibility with other machines for sharing (as VHS was becoming the format in the majority of homes), and brand loyalty to companies who licensed VHS (RCA, Magnavox, Zenith, Quasar, Mitsubishi, Panasonic, Hitachi, Sharp, even JVC itself, etc.). In addition, Sony, being the first producer to offer its technology, also thought it would establish Betamax as the leading format. This kind of lock-in and path dependence failed for Sony, but succeeded for JVC. For forty years, JVC dominated the home market with VHS, Super VHS, and VHS-C formats, and collected billions in royalty payments.

The video recording market was an unknown when VCRs first came on the market; as such, Sony and JVC were both developing technologies that were unproven. As a result of the desire to enter the marketplace faster, the firms both spent less time on research and development and tried to save money by picking a version of the technology they thought would do best without exploring the full gamut of options.

== Similar video format wars ==
Following the videotape format war, VHS was dominant until the creation of DVD technology. A minor skirmish arose over DIVX, but it died a quick death. Video 2000, a system developed by Grundig and Philips in 1979 was available for PAL and SECAM and distributed only in Europe, South Africa and Argentina.

The major electronics corporations agreed on a single standard for playback of pre-recorded material on DVDs. However, a later format war resulted from a failure to agree on a single standard for DVD's high-definition successor in May 2005. This format war ended in victory for Blu-ray in February 2008.

== See also ==
- Betacam
- Comparison of high-definition optical disc formats
- De facto standard
- Dominant design
- Peep search, a picture search system pioneered with Betamax and available on most video formats since
- Streaming war
