= 2012 Euro-American Challenge =

United States of America	Europe
34	7
Head coach: George St. Lawrence	Head coach: Kirk Heidelberg
	1	2	3	4	Total
United States of America	0	7	20	7	34
Europe	0	7	0	0	7
- Date: September 1, 2012
- Stadium: Stadion Narodowy
- Location: Warsaw, Poland
- Attendance: 25,000

The 2012 Euro-American Challenge - was an American football game played at Stadion Narodowy in Warsaw, Poland on September 1, 2012. The game was organized by the Collegiate Development Football League and Team USA American Football Stars Stripes. It was the first edition of the Euro-American Challenge.

== Background ==
The contest brought the best available American players who are interested in playing professionally in Europe versus the best European players who are willing to be recruited by American scouts to play in the United States. 11 former Football Championship Subdivision players were on Team America, including Laurence Maroney and Wesley Carroll. The Team Europe included players from Poland, Germany, Sweden, Finland and France.
