= De facto standard =

Convention that is widely accepted but unofficial

A de facto standard is a custom or convention that is commonly used even though its use is not required.

De facto is a Latin phrase (literally "of fact"), here meaning "in practice but not necessarily ordained by law" or "in practice or actuality, but not officially established".

A de facto standard contrasts an international standard which is defined by an organization such as International Standards Organization, or a standard required by law (also known as de jure standards).

Joint technical committee on information technology (ISO/IEC JTC1) developed a procedure in order for de facto standards to be processed through the formal standardization system to be transformed into international standards from ISO and IEC.

In social sciences a voluntary standard that is also a de facto standard is a typical solution to a coordination problem. The choice of a de facto standard tends to be stable in situations in which all parties can realize mutual gains, but only by making mutually consistent decisions. In contrast, an enforced de jure standard is a solution to the prisoner's dilemma.

== Examples ==
Examples of some well known de facto standards:

- The driver's seat side in a given country often starts as a user/industry preference, turning to a local tradition, then a traffic code.
- The QWERTY layout was one of several options for the layout of letters on typewriter (and later keyboard) keys.
- Early entrance to the market.

=== File formats ===
- PDF was first created in 1993 by Adobe. Adobe internal standards were part of its software quality systems, but they were neither published nor coordinated by a standards body. With the Acrobat Reader program available for free, and continued support of the format, PDF eventually became the de facto standard for printable documents. In 2005, PDF/A became a de jure standard as ISO 19005-1:2005. In 2008 Adobe's PDF 1.7 became ISO 32000-1:2008.
- AutoCAD DXF, an ASCII format for import and export of CAD drawings and fragments in the 1980s and 1990s. In the 2000s, XML-based formats emerged as de facto standards.
- The MP3 audio format started as an alternative to WAV for internet music distribution, then replaced it. It is now supported by the vast majority of music players, audio transport, audio storage, and non-commercial media.
- Microsoft Word DOC. Due to the market dominance of Word, it is supported by all office applications that intend to compete with it, typically by reverse engineering the undocumented file format. Microsoft has repeatedly internally changed the file specification between versions of Word to suit their own needs, while continuing to reuse the same file extension identifier for different versions.
- FITS and CSV file formats, commonly used in science and engineering, with FITS traditionally used in astronomy.

=== Connectors and interconnect standards ===
- Phone connector (3.5 mm jack), RCA and XLR connectors, used in the audio industry for connecting audio equipment such as headphones, mixing desks, microphones, stage lighting, etc.
- MIDI connection (using DIN connector or phone connector), electrical and protocol standard for connecting musical instruments, synthesizers, drum machines, sequencers, and some audio equipment.
- DMX512 (commonly just DMX) with XLR connector to control and sometimes power stage and venue lights, effects, smoke machines, laser projectors, and pyrotechnics.
- PCI Express electrical and mechanical interface, and interconnect protocol used in computers, servers, and industrial applications.
- GPIB, multi-device bus protocol, mechanical and electronic interface commonly found in electronic test equipment, e.g. digital multimeters, oscilloscopes, etc. Initially created by Hewlett Hewlett-Packard as HP-IP. Commonly used with SCPI protocol.
- HDMI, Display Port, VGA for video, RS-232 for low-bandwidth serial communication.
- USB for high-speed serial interface in computers and for powering or charging low-power external devices (like mobile phones, headphones, portable hard drives) usually using micro USB plug and socket.
- BNC for medium-frequency signal in electronic engineering testing (commonly used by signal generators, oscilloscopes, multimeters, etc.) and sometimes in video-signal delivery between devices in studios and other professional settings.
- AMP's AMP MATE-N-LOK / Molex's Standard 0.093" Pin Power plug and socket, commonly used on hard drives, and other medium-power devices both in PC, server, industrial applications, and others where standardized power connector for 5 V and 12 V is required, and off-the-shelf PSU can be used. In embedded applications it is usually replaced with smaller square connector, which is easier to connect.
- 2.54 mm (0.1 inch) pin spacing on many electronic components, including DIP, SIL packages, header connectors, and many more. The standard spacing enable use of these devices in prototyping boards and standardized sockets.
- 4–20 mA current loop, used in industrial control and automation.
- 3.5-inch and 2.5-inch hard drives.
- 19-inch rack standards for telecommunication, server, storage, audio, music, video, and power equipment.
- ATX motherboard, back plane, and power standards.

=== Materials and units of packaging ===
- Soldering alloys in electronics, like Sn_{60}Pb_{40}.
- Aluminium alloys, such as 6061.
- Intermodal 48-foot container.

=== Miscellaneous ===
- Many American-made spark plugs require a 13/16-inch hex socket (21 mm) to remove or install.
- The 1/2 inch (12.7 mm) spacing of the rollers in a bicycle chain.
- The IBM Personal Computer (PC). By one year after its 1981 release, John Dvorak described the PC as rapidly becoming a "de facto standard microcomputer". With the MS-DOS and Microsoft Windows operating systems, it gained a large share of the personal-computer market. Because of the great influence of the IBM PC on the personal computer market, competing products like the Rainbow 100 were eventually withdrawn.
- Programming languages that have multiple implementations such as PHP tend to also have a de facto standard. In PHP's case the de facto standard is the binaries available from php.net, rather than the Phalanger implementation.
- Use of programming languages R and Python in science and engineering disciplines, other than computer science, where automated analysis of data is required, while remaining simple enough for a non-professional.
- TeX typesetting system, commonly used in creating scientific articles and reports for publication (in fact many journals require the publication to be fully written in TeX).

== Standardization disputes ==
There are many examples of de facto consolidation of a standard by market forces and competition, in a two-sided market, after a dispute. Examples:

- Alternating current and direct current in the war of the currents.
- VHS over Betamax in the videotape format war.
- Blu-ray and HD DVD during the high-definition optical disc format war.
- Scalable Vector Graphics (SVG) over Adobe Flash for vector graphics web-page animations.

An example of an ongoing dispute is OASIS's OpenDocument format vs Microsoft's Office Open XML format.

== See also ==
- Platform evangelism
- Appeal to tradition
- Dominant design
- Embrace, extend, and extinguish
- Harmonization (standards)
- Monopoly
- Protocol ossification
- Specification
- Standardization
- Technical standard
