= Everyone's a Critic =

Everyone's a Critic (EaC) was a film community website. It began as an experiment using a collaborative filtering algorithm to obtain film recommendations from people who share similar tastes in film. Over time, this recommendation system website grew into an internet community of cinephiles, critics and reviewers.

== History ==
In 2002 Dan Seidner, a software developer from suburban Philadelphia, created a website where people could get film recommendations from other people who share their tastes in movies. Site members (henceforth referred to as critics) grade movies and get a list of all other critics from the site, in order of how close individual ratings are to theirs. From there, a critic can look through their closest critic's ratings to get film recommendations.

By clicking on the name of critics closest to your film tastes, you get a list of the movies they've seen that you haven't; in order from their highest rated films, down to the lowest rated. This method allows critics to not only use recommendations for what movies to go see, also what movies to avoid seeing.

EaC has evolved from a place to get film recommendations, to a community of film critics and cinephiles who write in-depth reviews, participate in film discussion, polls, contests and games. EaC has grown to over 2,900 critics, over 900,000 film ratings, over 19,000 film reviews, and over 170,000 films in the database.

== Grading films ==
EaC critics grade films using a scale similar to United States School Systems. A+ at the top of the scale and F at the bottom. The average ratings of the community generally fall between C+ and B−.

Critics can also give films Anticipation Ratings before the films are released. These grades are on a scale of 1 to 5. Rating an upcoming film a 5 represents a high expectation and excitement level, while a rating of 1 represents the opposite. Critics can view a list of upcoming films in order of the community's anticipation for the release of those films.

== Lists ==
EaC allows critics to create and maintain various lists.

=== My Critics ===
EaC critics can flag other critics for various reasons such as critics who share similar tastes, critics who write exceptional reviews, critics who are also friends, etc. EaC allows critics to filter some of the lists (described below) to show results based only on site members who have been flagged as My Critics.

=== Active Critics ===
EaC automatically flags critics that log into the site on a regular basis as Active Critics. Active Critics filters can be applied to some of the EaC lists (described below).

=== Comprehensive Film List ===
Critics can keep a list of every film they've ever seen. If there are films critics have seen that are not currently in the EaC database, critics can instantly add those films to the EaC database. This list can be ordered by the grade the critic assigned the films, alphabetically by title, and by the year released. This list can also be filtered by genre.

=== Top/Bottom 100 Lists ===
Critics can create hierarchies of their top and bottom films of all time. These lists are referred to as Top 100 and Bottom 100, but these lists aren't limited to 100 films, nor are 100 films required to create these lists. EaC automatically creates other lists based on the Top and Bottom 100 Lists. EaC will show the critic hierarchies of the actors, directors and writers that appear/work in the films that are listed in their Top and Bottom 100, along with the number of films each actor, director and writer appears in within the lists.

=== Top Actors, Directors and Writers ===
Critics can keep lists of people involved in filmmaking. There is a separate list for Actors, Directors and Writers. Critics can create and maintain these lists in a hierarchy according to the critic's favorites.

=== Wish List ===
EaC critics can create and update a Wish List of films they’ve yet to see, but would like to.

=== Custom Lists ===
EaC critics can create and maintain custom lists such as Favorite Concert Films or Documentaries I saw last year. Anything film related the critic can think of can be put into a list.

=== Movie Rankings ===
There are several lists on EaC that reflect the overall community rankings. There is The Top 200 Movies and The Bottom 200 Movies that show these hierarchies based on the community average. These lists are referenced in the following Wikipedia articles: Films that have been considered the greatest ever and List of films considered the worst

EaC critics can also see The Top 100 Somewhat Obscure Movies which is a list of the highest rated movies that have been rated by no less than 3 and no more than 12 critics total.

EaC critics can also see Adjustable Movie Rankings by applying filters to the lists. Critics can filter by year, genre, My Critics, movies the critic has rated and movies the critic has not rated.

=== Critic List ===
EaC critics can view a list of all other EaC critics with links to each critic's personal lists. This list can be ordered by name, join date, number of ratings, age and sex. This list can be filtered by Active Critics, date range, age, sex and name.

== Community ==
In addition to a recommendation system website and a place to keep various film related lists, EaC is also a community-oriented website. Discussion is a major part of the website and many friendships and partnerships have spawned from the EaC community. One example is the partnership of TC Candler, Richard Propes and Jacob Hall; EaC critics who've collaborated on their own film review website: independentcritics.com.

EaC critics can add films, actors, writers and directors to the EaC database causing the growth of the site data to be an interactive and community-oriented project. EaC critics voluntarily host community contests, polls and games.

=== Community outreach ===
Critics on EaC sponsored a year-long charity event called Words of Hope, raising money for child abuse charities: Prevent Child Abuse America and National Coalition Against Domestic Violence. Several EaC critics sponsored the event by donating money for every review written (within certain guidelines) on EaC for the year of 2005. Several critics made additional cash donations at the end of 2005. The event was run by Richard Propes, an EaC member who is the executive director of a non-profit organization out of Indiana called Tenderness Tour.

== See also ==
- List of films considered the worst
- Films considered the greatest ever
