= Dominant design =

Technological features that become de facto industry standards

Dominant design is a technology management concept introduced by James M. Utterback and William J. Abernathy in 1975, identifying key technological features that become a de facto standard. A dominant design is the one that wins the allegiance of the marketplace, the one to which competitors and innovators must adhere if they hope to command significant market following.

When a new technology emerges (e.g. computer GUI operating systems) – often firms will introduce a number of alternative designs (e.g. Microsoft – Windows, Apple Inc. – Mac OS and IBM – OS/2). Updated designs will be released incorporating incremental improvements. At some point, an architecture that becomes accepted as the industry standard may emerge, such as Microsoft Windows. The dominant design has the effect of enforcing or encouraging standardization so that production or other complementary economies can be sought. Utterback and Suarez (1993) argue that the competitive effects of economies of scale only become important after the emergence of a dominant design, when competition begins to take place on the basis of cost and scale in addition to product features and performance.

Dominant designs may not be better than other designs; they simply incorporate a set of key features that sometimes emerge due to technological path dependence and not necessarily strict customer preferences. An often cited, albeit incorrect, example is the QWERTY keyboard, supposedly designed to overcome operative limitations on the mechanical typewriter but now almost universally preferred over other keyboard designs. Dominant designs end up capturing the allegiance of the marketplace; this can be due to network effects, technological superiority, or strategic manoeuvering by the sponsoring firms.

Dominant designs are often only identified after they emerge. Some authors consider the dominant design as emerging when a design acquires more than 50% of the market share. A more promising approach is to study the specific product innovations introduced by different firms over time to determine which ones are retained.

== Origins of the theory ==
Utterback and Abernathy first introduced the concept of "dominant design" in 1975. They proposed that the emergence of a dominant design is a major milestone in an industry evolution and changed the way firms compete in an industry and thus, the type of organizations that succeed and prevail. A dominant design can be a new technology, product or a set of key features incorporated from different distinct technological innovations introduced independently in prior product variants. Their 1975 paper, however, never uses the term "dominant design". It does refer to "dominant strategy" and "dominant type of innovations". Yet, in their 1993 work, Suarez and Utterback reference the 1975 paper as the source of the concept of "Dominant design". David Teece, of later fame for the theory of dynamic capabilities, overtly develops the concept of dominant design in his 1984 paper on Profiting from technological innovation, in which he acknowledges the contribution of Utterback and Abernathy in their conceptual treatment of the evolution of technology in an industry.

== Dominant theory process ==
The process by which a specific design achieves dominance consists of a few characteristic milestones:

1. A pioneer firm or research organization begins conducting R&D with the intention of creating a new commercial product or improving an existing design.
2. The first working prototype of the new product/ technology is introduced, sending a signal to competitors to review the feasibility of their research programs.
3. The first commercial product is launched, connecting consumers to this new architecture for the first time. It is usually directed at a small group of customers. This milestone acts as a “last minute call” for competitors to review and speed up their research efforts.
4. A clear front-runner emerges from the early market. For example, in the personal computer industry, Apple Computers dominated after the introduction of their Apple I in 1976.
5. Finally, at some point in time, a particular technological trajectory achieves dominance and this marks the final milestone in the dominance process.

== Evidence and examples ==
Dominant design milestones have been identified in many product lines. The emergence of a dominant design typically coincides with the point at which the number of firms competing in the industry peaks. Once it emerges, it implicitly sends a message to producers and consumers that its key features is a "must have" by future products. Examples of a dominant design include the simple four function calculator and the iPod and iPhone. Other examples include:

- War of the currents between alternating- and direct-current electricity in the late 1800s.
- The videotape format war between Betamax and VHS, when VHS became the de facto video tape standard.
- The desktop metaphor introduced by Xerox's Alto became the dominant design in PC operating systems.
- A review of the Samsung Z5 MP3 player articulated the Apple/iPod dominant design
- Many industry examples are included in Utterback's book Mastering the Dynamics of Innovation (see references below)
- Douglas DC-3, considered a dominant airplane design consisting of variable-pitch propeller, retractable landing gear, monocoque, radial air-cooled engine, and wing flaps. (Peter Senges book The Fifth Discipline on p. 6)

== Implications for innovation and competitive dynamics ==
Utterback and Suarez propose that once a dominant design emerges, it can have a profound impact on both the direction of further technical advance, on the rate of that advance, and on the resulting industry structure and competitive dynamics. Prior to the creation of the dominant design, firms are constantly experimenting and therefore cannot enjoy economies of scale. After the emergence of the dominant design, some firms accumulate complementary assets and exploit possible economies of scale, which in turn raises entry and mobility barriers in the industry. Firms that enter the industry during a period of experimentation risk choosing the wrong technological path, but have high upside if they choose the right one. Pre-dominant design entrants have been shown to have a higher chance of survival than those that enter after the emergence of the dominant design. Utterback and Kim (1985) and Anderson and Tushman (1990) considered the effect of a disruption that invades a mature industry and thus starts a new cycle. In each cycle, the number of firms increases in the early ("fluid" or "ferment") period, reaches a peak with the emergence of the dominant design, decreases until a few firms dominate the industry, and then restarts again when a disruption creates the conditions for a new wave of entry and the re-enactment of the industry life cycle.

== See also ==
- Monopoly
