= Europae Archaeologiae Consilium =

Logo

The Europae Archaeologiae Consilium (Latin for European Archaeological Council), or EAC, is an international non-profit organisation established under Belgian law (Organisation number: 189062000 / TVA-number: 472502440), which brings together the heads of the national services with responsibility for the archaeological heritage.

The primary aims of the Europae Archaeologiae Consilium are to

1. support the management of the archaeological heritage throughout Europe;
2. monitor the implementation of the Valletta Treaty in Europe;
3. serve the needs of national archaeological heritage management agencies by providing a forum for organisations to establish closer and more structured co-operation and exchange of information, including developing common standards and strategies.

== History ==
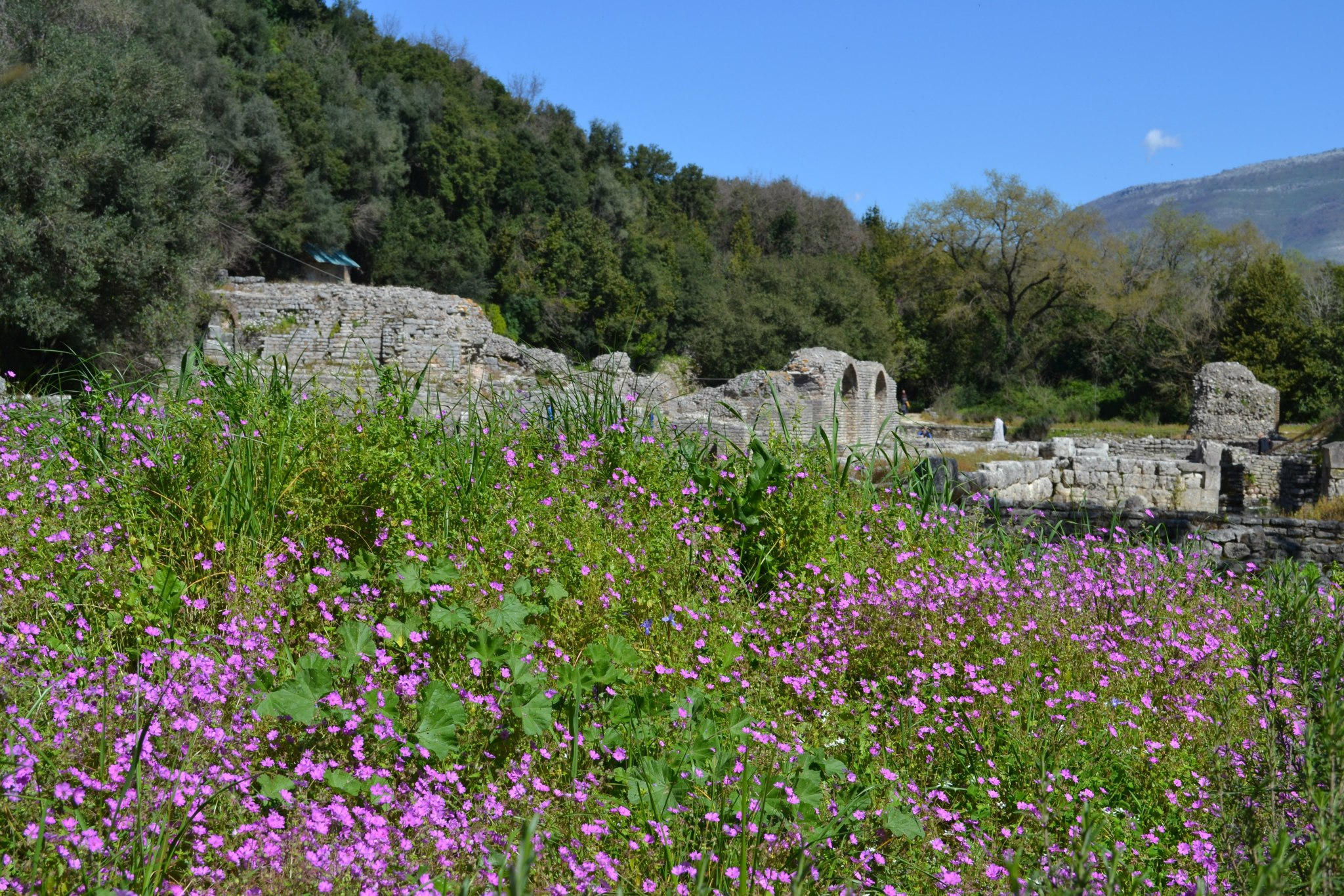
Theatre in Butrint (Albania), Setting for the 2013 General Assembly

The forerunner of the EAC was an expert committee charged by the Council of Europe with developing the European Convention on the Protection of the Archaeological Heritage (1992). After the convention was ratified, the committee continued its work, e. g. in the Council of Europe's Bronze Age Campaign and in regular meetings at the annual conference of the European Association of Archaeologists. The personal network resulting from these years of international cooperation led to the foundation of an association to support further projects such as the European Landscape Convention (or Florence Convention). The inaugural meeting of the EAC took place at the Council of Europe in Strasbourg on 25 November 1999. The first statutes were published on 24 August 2000 as an annex to the Belgian Official Journal. Since then the statutes have changed several times. The latest changes were adopted at the General Assembly in Paris in 2012 and were published as an annex to the Belgian Official Journal on 13 March 2013. The organization was based first in Brussels but moved to Namur in 2011.

In contrast to other archaeological associations such as the European Association of Archaeologists (EAA), the EAC does not represent a community of individual archaeologists but rather the national statutory authorities with responsibility for the management of archaeological heritage. Moreover, the EAC focuses primarily on issues of heritage management. At the Council of Europe, the EAC has held the status of an NGO observer member in the Steering Committee on Culture, Heritage and Landscape (CDCPP) since its establishment in 2012 and held the equivalent status with that committee's predecessors, first with the Steering Committee for Cultural Heritage (CDPAT) and then (from 2007) with the Steering Committee for Cultural Heritage and Landscape (CDPATEP).

== Objectives ==
The objectives of the EAC as expressed at its foundation are:

- to promote collaboration between the statutory bodies in Europe with responsibility for the management of the archaeological heritage
- to provide a platform for discussions and information exchange for all the institutions active in the field of archaeological heritage
- to observe and monitor the political developments in Europe concerning the archaeological heritage, and to give advice on these issues, especially to the European Union and the Council of Europe.
- to promote the protection, management, scientific interpretation, publication, presentation and understanding of archaeological remains.
- to collaborate with other institutions sharing equivalent aims

In order to achieve these aims the EAC seeks to exert influence on different domains of society. It strives to raise the awareness of the value of the archaeological heritage in politics as well as to the broader public, so that political decisions can take better account of archaeology. A key objective of the EAC is to ensure that the professional quality of archaeological work is carried out through the adoption of high pan-European quality standards. As part of this process, the development of common guidelines for the gathering and archival storage of archaeological data is currently in progress. Finally, the EAC considers that European collaboration in scientific research will make it possible to explore subjects of particular concern and enable the development of pan-European research programmes.

Special working groups of the EAC are concerned with topics of particular importance such as Underwater archaeology, rural land use (which deals with the impact of farming and modern land management on the archaeological resource), large-scale excavations, remote sensing and prospection (which includes aerial archaeology) and archaeological archives.

== Members ==
Member countries of the Europae Archaeologiae Consilium are:

founder members in 1999
Belgium
Croatia
Czech Republic
Estonia
Finland
Germany
Greece
Hungary
Ireland
Italy
Netherlands
Poland
Portugal
Spain
United Kingdom

joined later	year of joining
Switzerland	2001
Romania	2002
Turkey	2002
France	2003
Slovenia	2003
Denmark	2004
Iceland	2004
Lithuania	2004
Slovak Republic	2007
Sweden	2007
Albania	2011
Austria	2012
Latvia	2012
Norway	2015
Bulgaria	2018
Luxembourg	2018
Russia	2019

England is represented in the EAC by English Heritage, Ireland by the National Monuments Service of the Department of Arts, Heritage and the Gaeltacht.

== Periodic activities ==
In conjunction with its annual meeting the EAC organizes a General Assembly of its members and a symposium dedicated to a specific issue concerning archaeological heritage management and policy issues related to such heritage management. The proceedings of the symposium are published in the EAC occasional papers.
