= Euro-American Challenge =

American football event

The Euro-American Challenge - is an American football game that has been played annually since 2012 usually at the end of December. The game is organized by the Collegiate Development Football League.

== Background ==
The Euro-American Challenge Game (EAC) is the opening event with the CDFL’s National Scouting Showcase. The EAC is an annual event which pits the best available American free agent players (TEAM AMERICA) looking to sign a contract to play in North America or overseas against a selection of the top football players from across the continent of Europe (TEAM EUROPE). Football players including free agents and graduated seniors from the NCAA Division I Football Bowl Subdivision, NCAA Division I Football Championship, NCAA Division II, NCAA Division III and NAIA levels are eligible to participate. The Euro-American Challenge Game promotes American football as an International sport.

== Game results ==
Date	Winning team		Losing team		Attendance	Place
September 1, 2012	Team America	34	Team Europe	7	25,000	Warsaw, Poland
December 20, 2013	Team America	24	Team Europe	7	?	Myrtle Beach, South Carolina
December 19, 2014	Team America	45	Team Europe	0		Myrtle Beach, South Carolina
December 18, 2015	Team America	32	Team Europe	0		Myrtle Beach, South Carolina
December 16, 2016	Team America	36	Team Europe	24		Myrtle Beach, South Carolina
December 15, 2017	Team America	21	Team Europe	13		Myrtle Beach, South Carolina
