= Total Hi Def =

Total Hi Def Disc, also called Total HD or THD, was a planned optical disc format that included both of the rival high-definition optical disc formats, Blu-ray Disc and HD DVD. It was officially announced January 8, 2007 at the Warner Bros. press conference held at CES 2007. One side was to contain a single or dual-layer Blu-ray Disc, and the other was to contain a single or dual-layer HD DVD.

In November 2007, Warner Brothers put development of the Total HD discs on hold for an indefinite amount of time after several delays. Warner announced one of the reasons for doing so as a lack of interest in it from other major studios. Finally, on January 4, 2008, Warner Bros. Pictures announced that they were discontinuing HD DVD support, putting an end to THD's development.

== See also ==
- DualDisc and DVDplus – two technologies for combining CDs and DVDs
