= Fast Virtual Disk =

Fast Virtual Disk (better known as FVD) is a virtualization-oriented disk image file format developed by IBM for the QEMU virtualization platform. It differs from existing paravirtualization-centric virtual disk image formats through a design that emphasizes lack of contention and separation of concerns between the host and guest kernels through deduplication of filesystem and block layer storage management.

FVD can be written either directly to a physical or logical blockstore (avoiding host filesystem overheads), or to a regular host file system file. It strives to maintain similarity to raw disk layouts, eliminate host filesystem and disk image compression overheads, and minimize metadata-related overheads.

== See also ==
- Linux
- Open source
