= High-Definition Versatile Disc =

DVD-based format

High-Definition Versatile Disc (HVD) was an Asian standard of advanced high-definition technology originally developed by Amlogic, for high-definition video. The format supported 720p, 1080i, or 1080p video on version 1 discs. Version 2 of the format added high-resolution beyond the standard fare of HD for use on non-TV monitors that support higher resolutions, up to 1080p.

A modified MPEG-2 MP@HL video-codec was used and the format supported audio encoded in Dolby AC3, DTS, Dolby Digital EX, DTS ES, and Prologic 2 audio formats.

All HVDs used standard DVD discs. While the format was referred to as the HVD acronym, it had no relation to the Holographic Versatile Disc format that came among later and utilised the same acronym. There were only a few DVD players which supported this format. Nero Showtime, Media Player Classic, PowerDVD, VLC media player, and Kodi are the few known software packages to handle the format as the MPEG2 files are non-standard. Unlike the successful VCD, the format had little acceptance even in Asia and the discs are now not found anywhere.

== See also ==
- Enhanced Versatile Disc
