= Enhanced Audio Codec =

Enhanced Audio Codec is an audio codec developed and owned by Beijing E-World, that uses a unique perceptual model, spectral band replication, to compress the audio signal by utilizing the redundancy as well as the relevancy. The EAC codec supports mono, stereo and 5.1 surround sound modes for encoding and decoding. EAC is part of the EVD system specification.
