= Forward Versatile Disc =

Optical disc format intended as an alternative to HD DVD and Blu-ray

Logo for the Forward Versatile Disc

Forward Versatile Disc (FVD) is an optical disc format developed in Taiwan as an offshoot of DVD technology. Jointly created by the Advanced Optical Storage Research Alliance (AOSRA) and the Industrial Technology Research Institute (ITRI), FVD was designed as a cost-effective alternative for storing high-definition content. Structurally similar to a DVD, it uses the same pit lengths and a red laser for reading. By slightly reducing the track pitch, FVD achieves higher capacity, allowing each layer to store 5.4 GB of data, compared to the standard DVD's 4.7 GB. The specification allows up to three layers for a total of 15 GB in storage. WMV9 is used as the video codec allowing for 135 minutes of 720p video on a dual layer disc, and 135 minutes of 1080i video on a three-layer disc. FVD uses AACS copy protection which is one of the schemes used in both HD DVD and Blu-ray Discs.

An FVD disc can either be an FVD-1 or FVD-2 disc: FVD-1: The coding format of the first generation of FVD adopts 8/16 modulation codes (same as DVD). FVD-2: The second generation will use the more efficient 8/15 coding for increasing the ECC capability (to avoid DVD patents).

The FVD format is apparently defunct.
