= Jiangsu Jingdong Cargo Airlines =

Chinese cargo airline

Jiangsu Jingdong Cargo Airlines 江苏京东货运航空
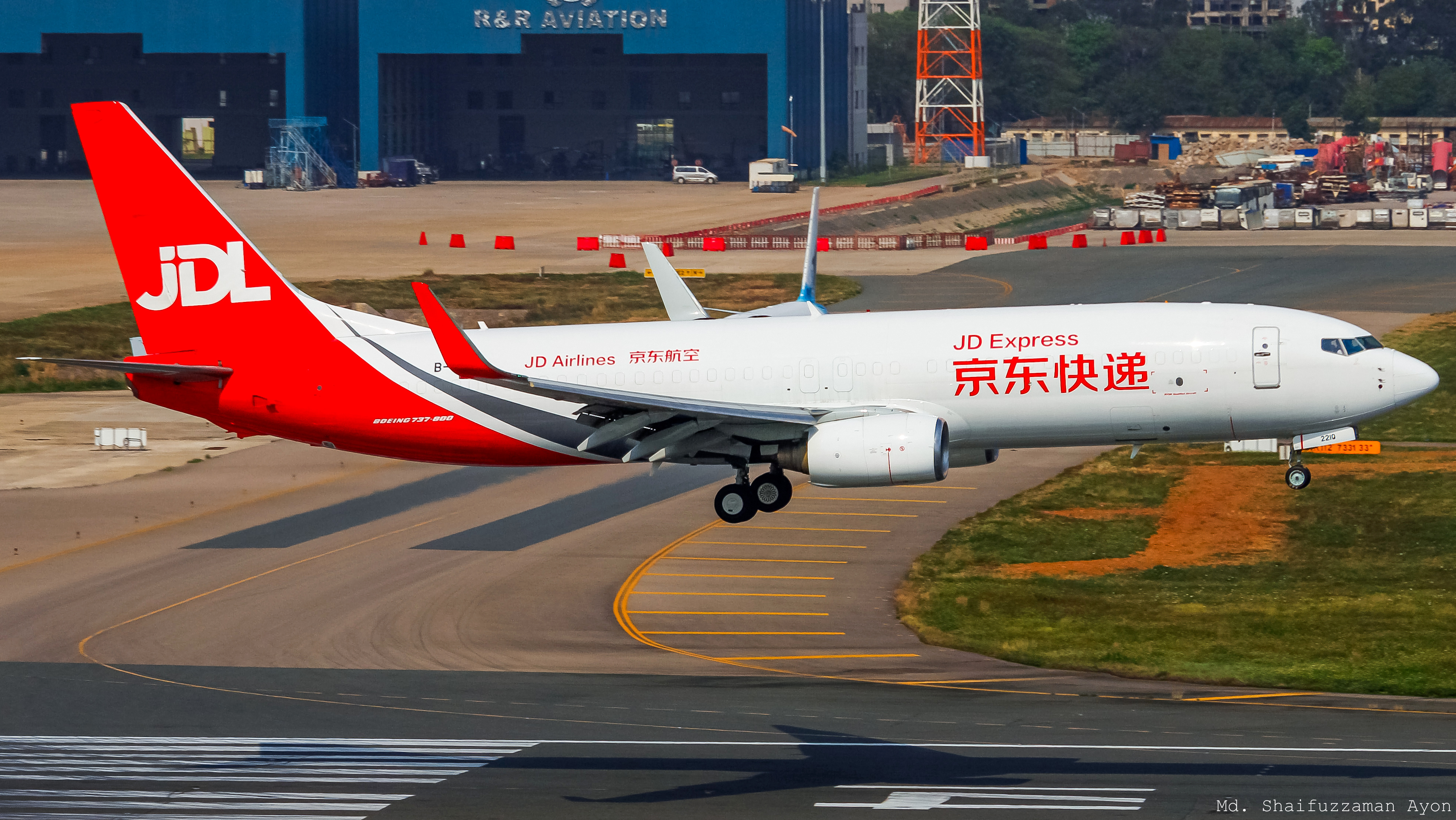
IATA	ICAO	Call sign
JG	JDL	JINGDONG
- Founded: 2019; 7 years ago
- Commenced operations: 31 August 2022; 4 years ago
- Hubs: Nantong Xingdong International Airport
- Fleet size: 10

Jiangsu Jingdong Cargo Airlines (江苏京东货运航空), also referred to as JD Airlines or JDL Airlines, is a cargo airline and a subsidiary of JD Logistics based in China.

== History ==
Jiangsu Jingdong Cargo Airlines was established in 2019, co-founded by Suqian Jingdong (part of JD Logistics of JD.com) with a 75% stake and Nantong Airport Group with a 25% stake, forming part of their long-term strategy to vertically integrate its logistics network and reduce reliance on third-party air-freight providers along with helping them boost their long-haul freight capacity, improve delivery efficiency and ensure the stability of supply chains. The airline has a registered capital of CNY600 million ($92.88 million).

On 31 August 2022, the airline received its air operator certificate (AOC) from the Civil Aviation Administration of China (CAAC), marking it as the first locally based transport airline in the Jiangsu province. Commercial operations commenced shortly after in September, with early routes prioritizing the Yangtze River Delta, the Bohai Economic Rim and the Pearl River Delta, specifically focusing on Nantong and Wuxi in the Jiangsu province and Beijing, and Shenzhen in the Guangdong province.

The airline primarily focuses on domestic cargo services but has plans to expand internationally, specifically targeting Southeast Asia, Japan, South Korea, and eventually Europe and North America.

== Fleet ==
As of 2025, JD Airlines operates a fleet of ten Boeing 737-800BCF aircraft. The airline expanded its fleet through a 2024 lease agreement with AerCap for four additional 737-800BCF aircraft, and introduced its tenth and most recent aircraft, registered B-226T, into service in January 2025. Each aircraft offers a maximum payload of around 23 tonnes.
