= Zhang Zetian =

Chinese businesswoman (born 1993)

- 章泽天
- Born: 18 November 1993 (age 32); Nanjing, Jiangsu, China
- Other name: Nancy Zhang
- Education: Tsinghua University (BA); University of Cambridge (MBA)
- Spouse: Liu Qiangdong (m. 2015)
- Children: 1

Zhang Zetian (Chinese: 章泽天; born 18 November 1993) is a Chinese businesswoman who is the chief fashion adviser of the luxury business of JD.com. She gained initial fame from the popularity of a photograph of her holding milk tea, and was nicknamed "Sister Milk Tea" (奶茶妹妹; nǎichá mèimei). She later married JD.com's billionaire founder Liu Qiangdong, and became an investor in several companies. She has been included in the list of Chinese billionaires by New Frontier and is considered to be China's youngest female billionaire.

== Career ==
Zhang initially gained fame when a photograph of her holding a cup of milk tea went viral on the internet. This led to her nickname of "Sister Milk Tea". She went on to appear in a promotional video supporting the 2014 Summer Youth Olympics in Nanjing but turned down an offer to appear in the film The Flowers of War by director Zhang Yimou.

She attended Tsinghua University. While studying abroad at Barnard College in the United States, she met Liu Qiangdong for the first time. They initially stated that they were only studying together. The pair married in Sydney in 2015 after dating for three years. She was 22; he was 41. It had originally been rumored that the duo were planning to marry in Beijing, after they were photographed at a marriage registry in the city. In March 2016, Zhang gave birth to a daughter.

Zhang holds an MBA from Cambridge Judge Business School and was a student at King's College, Cambridge.

When the magazine New Fortune published a top 500 Chinese rich list in May 2017, Zhang was the youngest woman on the list. Zhang and Liu share several investments, including holdings in companies such as Uber China and a 17.3% stake of baby food company Bubs Australia via Zhang's investment company. Zhang uses her followers on social media to promote companies she is involved with, which includes her accounts on Instagram and Sina Weibo.
