= CPE (investment firm) =

Chinese alternative investment firm

- Native name: CPE源峰
- Formerly: CITIC Private Equity
- Type: Private
- Industry: Alternative investments
- Founded: June 2008; 18 years ago
- Headquarters: Beijing, China
- Key people: Liu Lefei (CEO)
- Products: Private equity
- AUM: US$14 billion (2024)
- Website: www.cpe-fund.com

CPE (Chinese: CPE源峰; pinyin: Yuánfēng) is a Chinese alternative investment firm headquartered in Beijing. Previously known as CITIC Private Equity, it was the private equity investment arm of CITIC Securities before it was spun off as an independent firm in 2018.

== Background ==
CITIC Private Equity was founded in June 2008 during the 2008 financial crisis as the private equity investment arm of CITIC Securities. It quickly gained a high profile in the private equity industry after hiring Liu Lefei as chairman. Liu who is considered a princeling is the son of top-ranking CCP official Liu Yunshan and was previously the chief investment officer of China Life Insurance Company.

In January 2010 after taking over a year in fundraising, CITIC Private Equity raised 9 billion yuan ($1.32 billion) for its first industrial investment fund called CITIC Mianyang Private Equity Fund. It was the largest yuan-denominated private equity fund ever raised in China at the time. Wu Yibing, the then-president of CITIC Private Equity stated that two-thirds of the fund will be allocated to companies in the state sector, where the fund enjoys good access partially because of its links to CITIC Group. In addition the fund would only seek minority interests in companies as founders were reluctant to step aside. The fund would play on the aspirations of local companies to emulate Chinese corporate success stories such as Lenovo and Haier. Notable investments of the fund included Wind Information.

In June 2012, Liu resigned from his position of chairman at CITIC Private Equity although he would still remain as CEO of the firm.

In 2018, CITIC Securities spun off CITIC Private Equity as an independent firm when it raised a $2.3 billion fund. It was subsequently renamed to CPE. Investors of its later funds included GIC and Temasek. Companies the funds invested in included DiDi and JD Health.

In September 2023, CPE was mentioned in an opinion piece by Marc Thiessen in The Washington Post that concerned Vivek Ramaswamy. During his 2024 presidential campaign, Ramaswamy portrayed himself as tough on China, promising to bar American companies from doing business there. However it was revealed that in 2017, Ramaswamy partnered with CPE to form a company called Sinovant. In 2019, Ramaswamy partnered with CPE again to launch Cytovant Sciences. In 2023, a Roivant Sciences spokesperson told The New Republic that both companies never generated sales or profits and were no longer operating. Since Ramaswamy's most recent deal with CPE was just over four years ago, his sudden conversion from China dealmaker to China hawk was deeply suspect.

== See also ==
- CITIC Group
- CITIC Securities
- CITIC Capital
