= Sandy Xu =

Chinese business executive

Sandy Ran Xu
- 许冉
- Education: Peking University
- Occupation: Business executive
- Title: Chief executive officer of JD.com
- Term: May 2023 – present
- Predecessor: Lei Xu
- Board member of: Baidu

Sandy Ran Xu (Chinese: 许冉; pinyin: Xǔ Rǎn) is a Chinese business executive who has been chief executive officer of JD.com since May 2023 and of its JD Retail division since November 2023. Xu is the company's third CEO and the first woman to hold the position.

Before joining JD.com in 2018, Xu spent nearly 20 years at PricewaterhouseCoopers in Beijing and San Jose, California, where she became an audit partner. She joined JD.com as chief financial officer of JD Retail and became group chief financial officer in June 2020.

Xu has been an executive director at JD.com since May 2023 and an independent director at Baidu since 2024.

== Education ==
Xu received a bachelor's degree from Peking University in 1998 with a double major in information science and economics. She has held certified public accountant qualifications in both China and the United States.

== Career ==
=== PricewaterhouseCoopers ===
Xu joined PricewaterhouseCoopers in 1998 and worked in the firm's Beijing and San Jose offices. She became an audit partner, specializing in the technology, media, and telecommunications sectors and U.S. capital markets.

=== JD.com ===
==== Finance roles ====
Xu joined JD.com in July 2018. She oversaw group finance, accounting, and tax, and served as chief financial officer of JD Retail from July 2018 to May 2020. In March 2020, JD.com named her, then a senior vice president, to succeed Sidney Huang as group chief financial officer, with the handover beginning that June. According to 36Kr, she helped complete JD.com's acquisitions of the listed companies Dada, Deppon, and China Logistics Property during her time as group CFO. The same report credits her with work on the restructuring of JD Technology and the company's secondary listing in Hong Kong.

==== Chief executive tenure ====
On May 11, 2023, JD.com announced that Xu would succeed Lei Xu, who was retiring for personal reasons, as chief executive officer and would join the board as an executive director. She became the company's third CEO and the first woman in the role. Citi analysts called the appointment surprising and said it could signal that JD.com's major restructuring was largely done. 36Kr reported that she had not previously run a frontline unit of the core e-commerce business, and compared her move from CFO to CEO with the path taken by Alibaba chief executive Daniel Zhang.

On November 15, 2023, Xu also became chief executive of JD Retail, replacing Xin Lijun. Fortune tied the change to a slower-than-expected recovery in consumer spending and competition from PDD Holdings, and noted it came days after the 2023 Singles' Day sales.

In August 2024, the Financial Times reported that founder and chairman Richard Liu had been leading the company from London, with continued involvement in investment strategy, deals, and expansion. JD.com told the FT that Xu leads the management team and oversees daily operations.

== Board memberships ==
Xu has been an executive director of JD.com since May 2023. She has served as an independent director of Baidu since January 2024. As of 2023, she was also a director of JD Technology. She serves on the board of Yonghui Superstores.

== Recognition ==
Fortune named Xu to its global Most Powerful Women list in 2023, 2024, and 2025, and to its Most Powerful Women Asia list in 2024 and 2025. Forbes included her on its list of the world's 100 most powerful women in 2025.
