= MD Data =

Type of magneto-optical medium

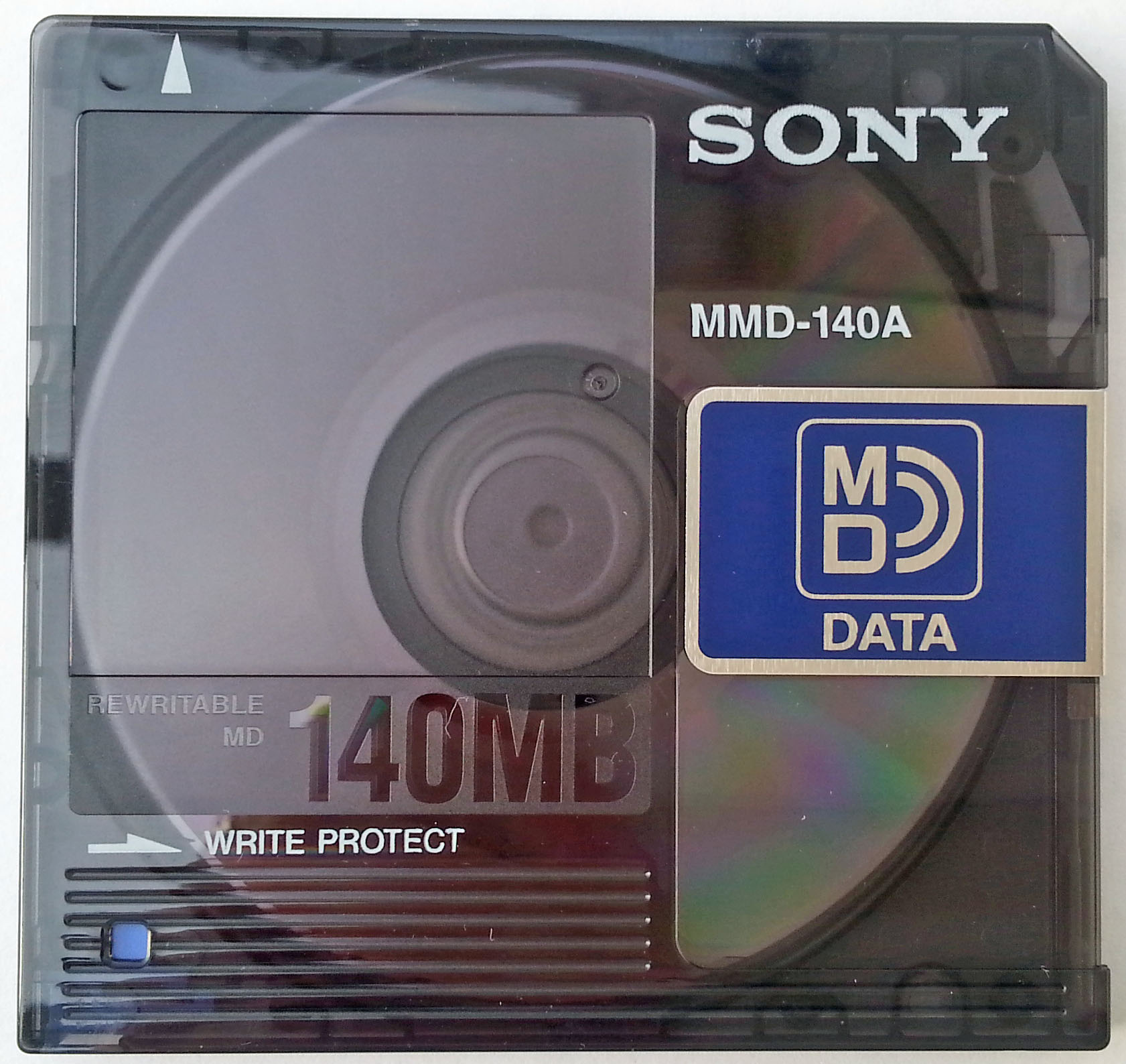
- MD Data Sony MMD-140A
- Media type: Magneto-optical disc
- Capacity: 140 MB
- Read mechanism: 780 nm semiconductor laser diode
- Write mechanism: Magnetic field modulation
- Developed by: Sony
- Usage: Data storage
- Extended from: Floppy disk MiniDisc
- Extended to: Hi-MD
- Released: July 1993

MD Data is a type of magneto-optical medium derived from MiniDisc.

In developing and marketing it, Sony was trying to set the new standard for removable media to replace the 3½-inch diskette it had also helped create. MD Data competed in a format war with other disks such as SyQuest's EZ 135, Imation's SuperDisk, and the Iomega Zip. Despite some early successes and niche uses (such as amongst musicians), ultimately neither MD Data nor any of its competitors succeeded in becoming the de facto new universal standard fully replacing the 3.5 inch diskette; with recordable CDs coming closest to filling the role, followed by USB flash drives.

== Overview ==
MD Data disks can be fully read-only, fully rewritable, or be a hybrid of the two, with a portion of a disk being read-only and while another is rewritable.

With 140 MB disks, MD Data offered about 100 times as much storage capacity as ordinary diskettes, and more than its competitors like the Zip (100 MB), SuperDisk (120 MB), and EZ 135 (135 MB), in a physically smaller medium.

The format was featured in products such as still cameras, a PDA, document scanners, and image storage and editing systems.

Another use was in 4- and 8-track multitrack recording decks. Meant as a step up from the popular 4-track cassette-based studios, these recorders enjoyed a brief prominence before they were replaced by relatively affordable and far more flexible direct-to-hard drive recording on Windows and Macintosh based computers. Some examples of products that used the format are a few multitrack "portastudio"-style audio recorders such as Sony's MDM-X4 and Tascam's 564.

Sony's MDH-10 MD Data disk drive, meant for use with Windows and Mac PCs, could also play back audio MiniDiscs. However, the drive was expensive compared to the Zip drive and others.

== MD Data2 ==
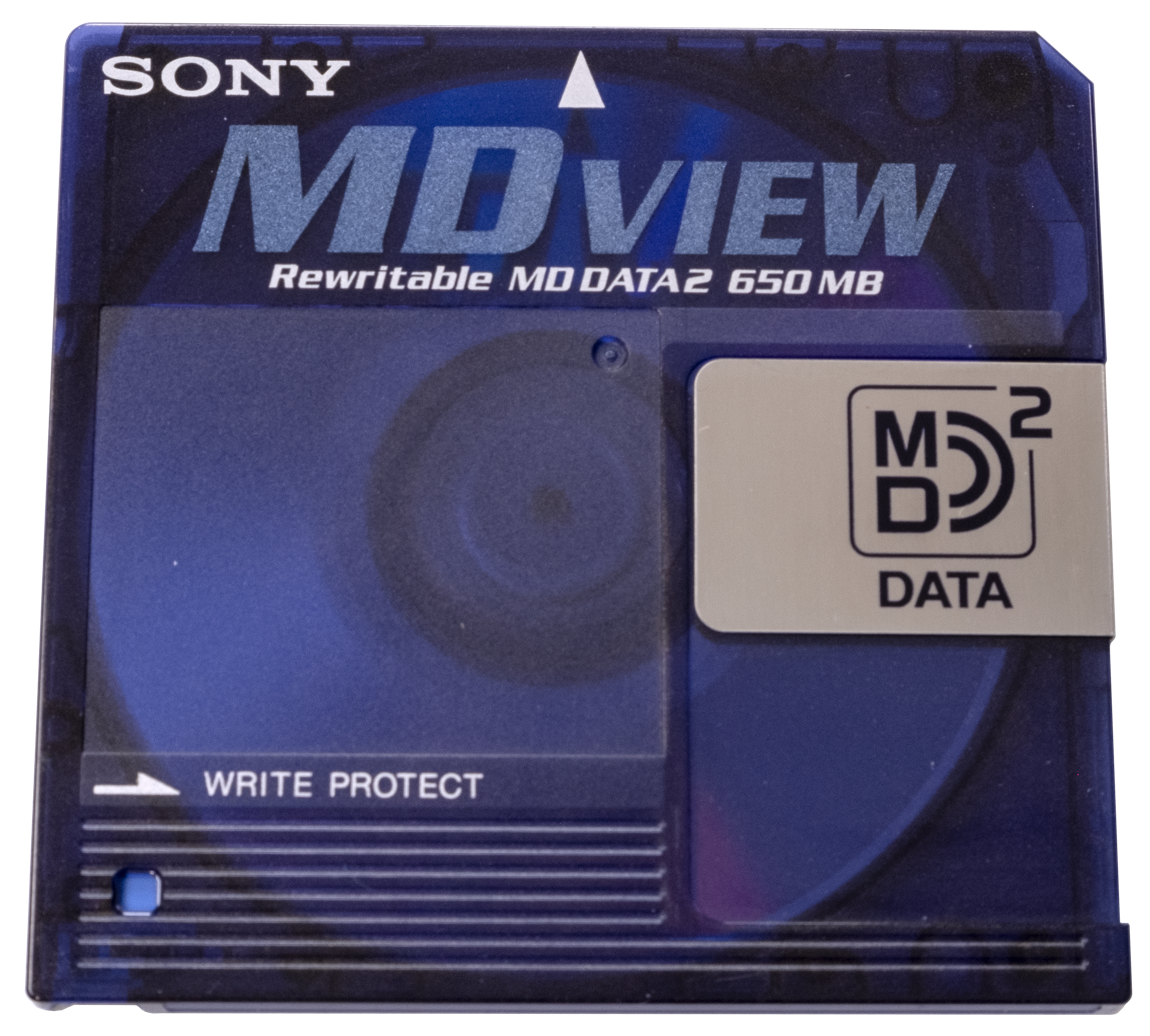
MD Data2 logo and disc

In 1997, Sony introduced the MD Data2 format at 650 MB. The only product that used the format was Sony's DCM-M1 camcorder (capable of still images and MPEG-2 video).

== Hi-MD ==
Hi-MD, introduced in 2004 allows 340MB or 1GB of any type of data to be stored on a Hi-MD formatted MiniDisc, succeeding MD Data and MD Data2.

== Gallery ==
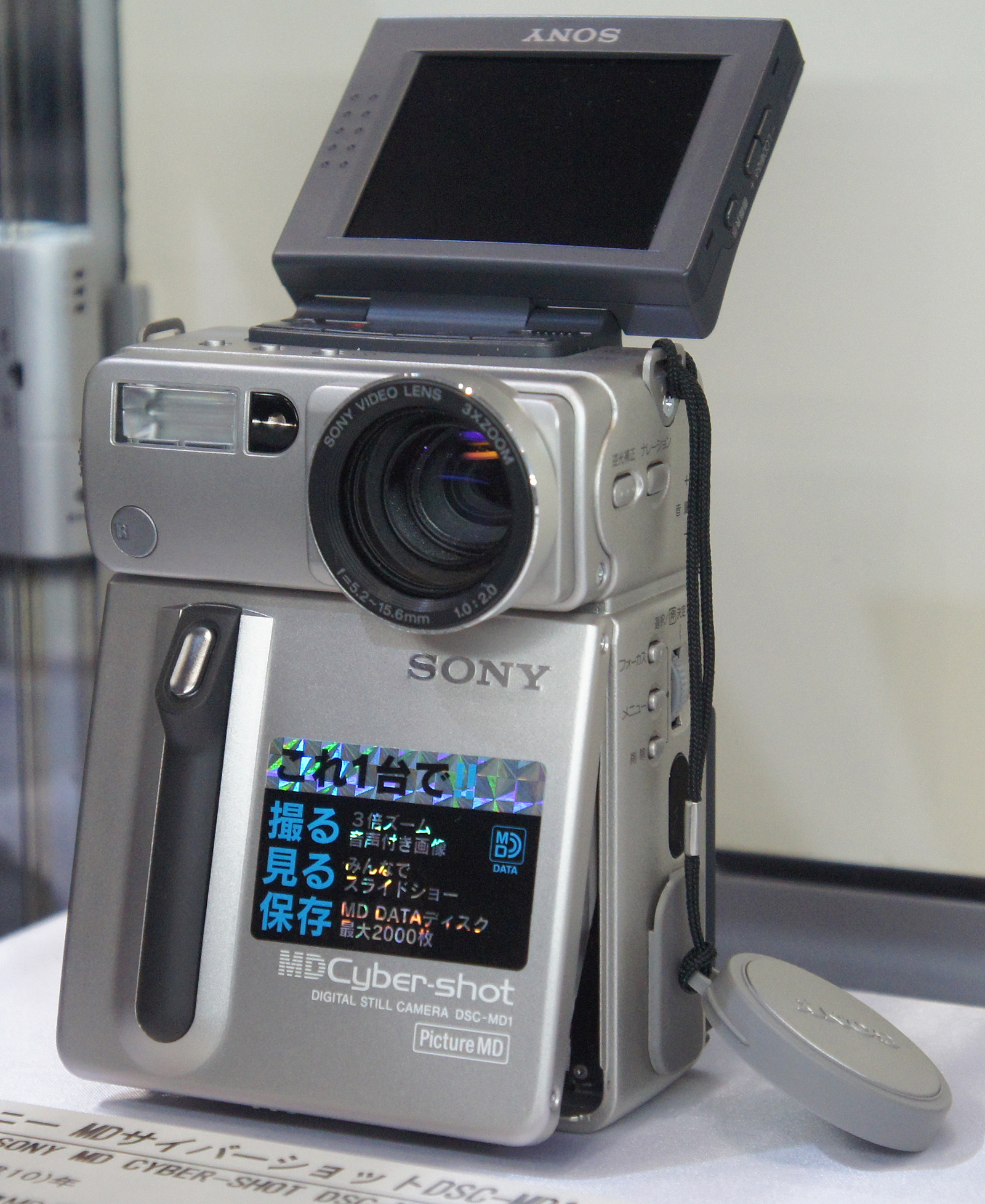
The Sony Cyber-shot DSC-MD1 was the only Cyber-shot camera using MD Data

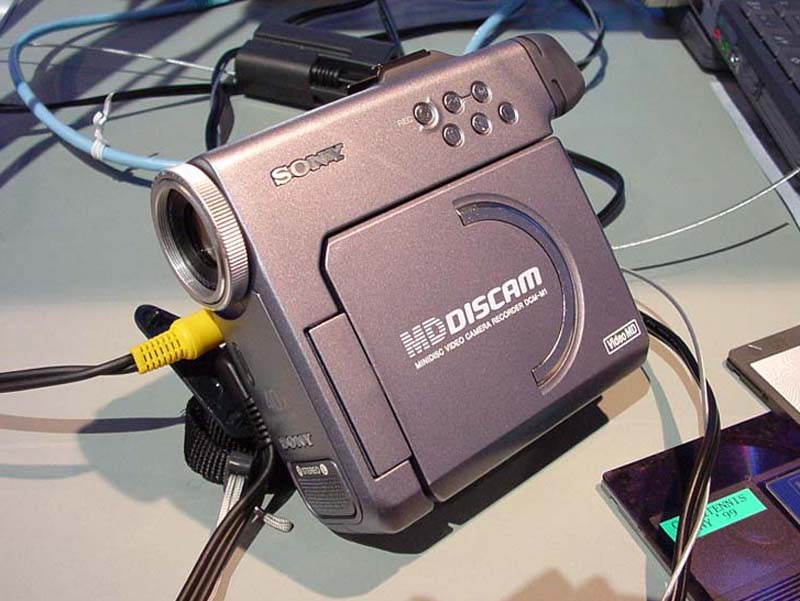
The camcorder Sony DCM-M1 records 20 minutes of MPEG2-Video on a MD Data2 disc

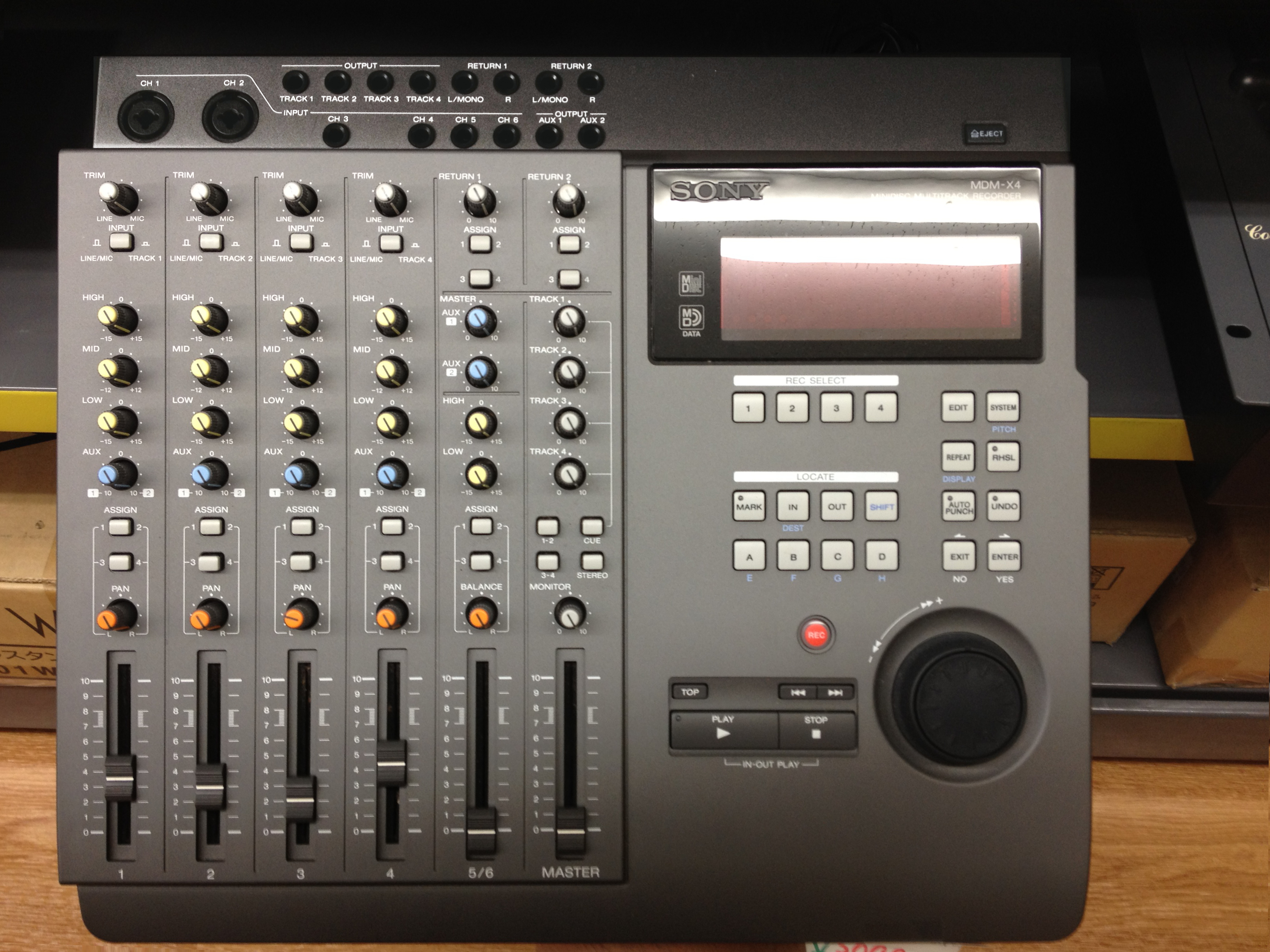
Sony MDM-X4 Multitrack Recorder

== See also ==
- MiniDisc
- Hi-MD
