= JD Asia No 1 Warehouse =

Automated warehouse in Shanghai, China

JD Asia No 1. Warehouse is a fully automatic warehouse operated by robot by created by JD.com. The warehouse is located in Shanghai.
