= JD Health =

JD.com healthcare unit

JD Health International Inc.
- Native name: 京东健康股份有限公司
- Company type: Public subsidiary
- Traded as: SEHK: 6618; Hang Seng Index component
- Industry: Digital health
- Founded: February 2014; 12 years ago
- Headquarters: Beijing, China
- Key people: Liu Qiangdong (Chairman); Jin Enlin (CEO)
- Revenue: ▲CN¥53.53 billion (2023)
- Net income: ▲CN¥2.14 billion (2023)
- Total assets: ▲CN¥64.29 billion (2023)
- Total equity: ▲CN¥49.37 billion (2023)
- Number of employees: 3,118 (2023)
- Parent: JD.com
- Website: ir.jdhealth.com

JD Health (JDH; Chinese: 京东健康; pinyin: Jīngdōng Jiànkāng) is a Chinese company listed in Hong Kong that focuses on providing digital health services and resources. It is currently the healthcare unit of JD.com (JD).

== History ==
JDH was founded in 2014 when the healthcare business of JD started operating as a stand-alone business unit. Hillhouse Investment was among the investors in JDH.

In August 2020, JDH launched 'JD Family Doctor,' a telemedicine service designed to provide whole families—up to eight people—with continuous, personalized online healthcare. Subscribers received 24-hour access to general practitioners via text, photo uploads, voice, and video consultations, along with prescriptions, follow-up visits, and hospital appointment bookings. Despite substantial investment and ambitious goals—including plans to serve 50 million families within five years—the division struggled to gain traction and achieve profitability. Resistance from doctors affiliated with public hospitals further strained operations. Ultimately, JD Health discontinued the family doctor division in May 2024.

In December 2020, JDH held its initial public offering (IPO) and became a publicly listed company on the Hong Kong Stock Exchange. The IPO raised US$3.5 billion and was the second largest offering in Hong Kong that year after its parent JD held a secondary listing earlier in June. On its trading debut, JDH shares surged 75% due to heavy demand from investors. Due to the COVID-19 pandemic, patient fears over visiting hospitals caused online consultations to jump in early 2020. JDH hosted over 100,000 online consultations a day with a peak of 150,000 during the height of the pandemic.

In June 2023, JDH was added as a constituent to the Hang Seng Index.

== See also ==
- JD.com
