= DWDD =

Media reproducing technology

The DWDD (Domain Wall Displacement Detection) is a media reproducing technology developed by Canon and Sony and first implemented in a commercial product in 2004 as part of Sony's Hi-MD format. The DWDD technology uses a physics phenomenon called domain wall displacement, which shortens the masks but does not need to change the laser beam. With such technology, the density of the magneto-optical disc could be increased dramatically.
