= JD Logistics =

Chinese supply chain management provider

JD Logistics, Inc.
- Company type: Public subsidiary
- Traded as: SEHK: 2618
- Industry: Logistics
- Founded: 2007; 19 years ago
- Headquarters: Beijing, China
- Key people: Liu Qiangdong (chairman); Wei Hu (CEO)
- Revenue: ▲CN¥166.62 billion (2023)
- Net income: ▲CN¥1.17 billion (2023)
- Total assets: ▲CN¥112.90 billion (2023)
- Total equity: ▲CN¥55.37 billion (2023)
- Number of employees: 457,015 (2023)
- Parent: JD.com
- Website: www.jdl.com

JD Logistics (JDL), also known as JINGDONG Logistics (pinyin: Jīngdōng) is a Chinese supply chain management and logistics company. It is a subsidiary of JD.com.

== Background ==
The company was initially established as an internal department of JD.com and its subsidiaries in 2007.

On 23 November 2016, the department became a stand-alone business with the name JD Logistics and began to conduct businesses for external customers, This was done as JD.com wanted to expand outside China and would need to expand its infrastructure.

In October 2017, JDL launched its first fully automated B2C warehouse in Shanghai. It was expected to handle over 200,000 orders per day.

In May 2021, JDL held its initial public offering and became a publicly listed company on the Hong Kong Stock Exchange. It raised US$ 3.2 billion and was the second largest listing in Hong Kong that year.

In March 2022, JDL acquired a majority stake in domestic courier company Deppon Logistics for 9 billion yuan (US$1.42 billion). This was done to expand its logistics capability amid the e-commerce boom that resulted from the COVID-19 lockdown in China.

As of September 30, 2023, JDL operated over 1,600 warehouses. Including warehouse space managed through the Open Warehouse Platform, JD Logistics' warehouse network had an aggregate gross floor area of over 32 million square meters.
