= Hi-MD =

Data storage format

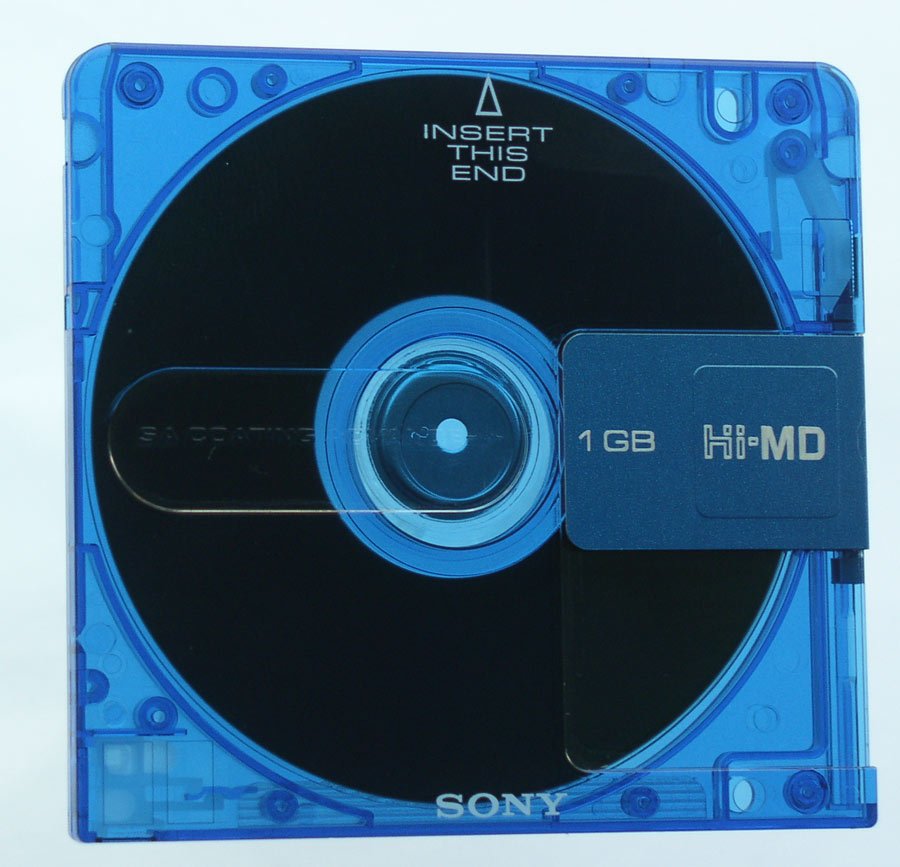
- Front view
- Media type: Magneto-optical disc
- Encoding: Linear PCM
- Capacity: 1 GB
- Read mechanism: 780 nm semiconductor laser diode
- Write mechanism: Magnetic field modulation
- Developed by: Sony
- Usage: Audio and data storage
- Extended from: MiniDisc; MD Data
- Released: January 2004

Hi-MD is a magneto-optical disc-based data storage format. It was a further development of the MiniDisc. With its release in late 2004, came the ability to use newly developed, high-capacity 1 gigabyte Hi-MD discs, in the same dimensions as MiniDisc. The last recorder and player was discontinued in 2011. Blank discs stopped production in September 2012.

== Overview ==
Hi-MD has several Walkman-selectable audio recording codecs, in order of quality: PCM, Hi-SP, and Hi-LP. Hi-MD Walkmans are backward compatible with MiniDisc playback and most can record. Hi-MD can store computer files and audio data. A bus-powered Hi-MD Walkman is seen as standard USB Mass Storage device with a FAT filesystem.

Since the release of Sony's music management program, SonicStage 3.4, virtually all digital rights management was removed for compatible Hi-MD machines.

In 2005, Sony announced Hi-MD Photo. The Sony MZ-DH10P Walkman was released to showcase the format with a 1.3 megapixel digital camera.

In March 2006, Sony released the MZ-RH1 Hi-MD Walkman in Japan, which was later followed in other regions. With this unit, Sony enabled faster-than-real time transfers from MiniDisc to computers. Sony made tangible speed improvements to the device over previous generations of Hi-MD recorders. The result being that the transfer times to and from computer are—under certain circumstances—cut in half over previous models, but still noticeably slower than flash memory and hard drive-based portables, because of the nature of the Hi-MD magneto-optical system.

Some later ("second-generation") Hi-MD devices offered native MP3 support.

== Marketing ==
In 2006, Sony positioned Hi-MD as a Digital Audio Tape (DAT) alternative after discontinuing the format the year before, placing the MZ-RH1 Hi-MD Walkman under the Pro Audio section of its "Broadcast & Business Solutions Company" website, alongside its flash memory-based recorder, the PCM-D1. DAT is a high-quality digital tape format that found a niche with musicians and studios. DAT portables have commonly been used for field recording, but have gradually been replaced by solid-state and hard drive-based units like the Aaton Cantar, the Zaxcom Deva, and similar units from Fostex and Sound Devices.

The MZ-M200 Walkman is Sony's MZ-RH1 with a stereo microphone included. The MZ-RH1 was targeted to a more general customer on Sony's consumer electronics sites and comes with no microphone bundle. The microphone was included to enable Hi-MD as a field recorder, and the higher price reflects the added value of the microphone.

MD had success in Asia (particularly in Japan and Hong Kong), but North America and Europe leaned toward either flash or hard drive-based systems. For professional recording, many offer features such as professional XLR microphone inputs, among other pro-centric features. These units were typically significantly larger and heavier than a Hi-MD Walkman, often with reduced battery life and higher prices. Hi-MD and MiniDisc recorders are no longer being manufactured, but their role has been taken over by relatively inexpensive flash memory based portable field recorders such as the Edirol R-09HR and the Olympus LS-10.

Gallery
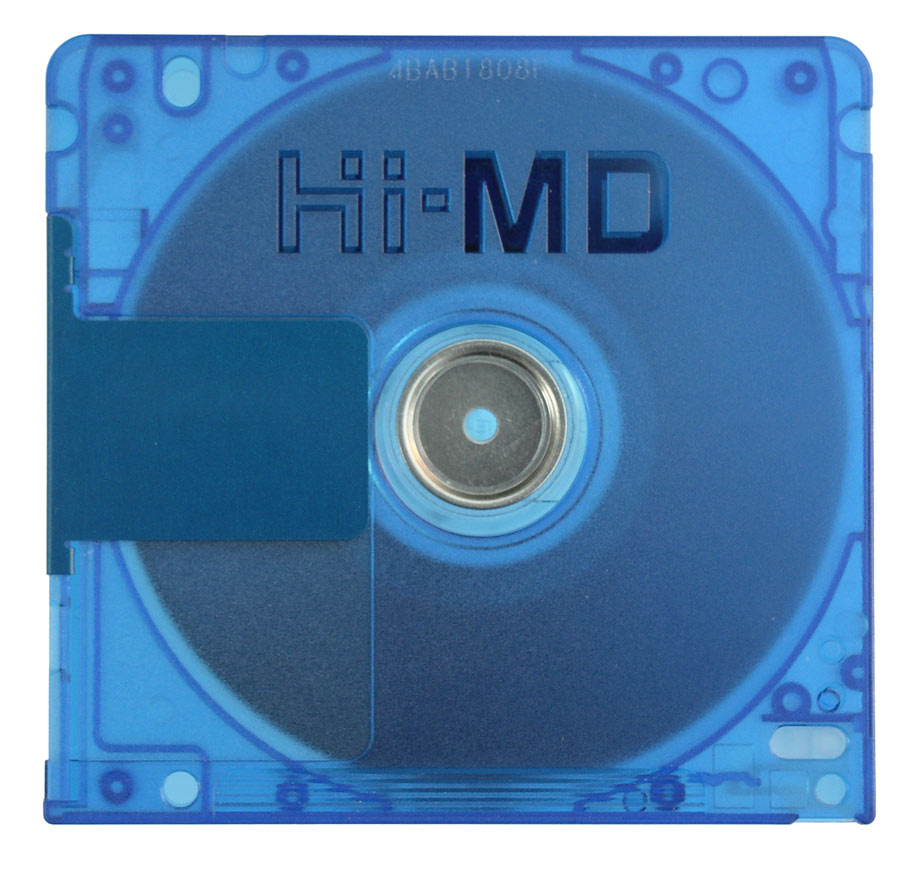
Rear view

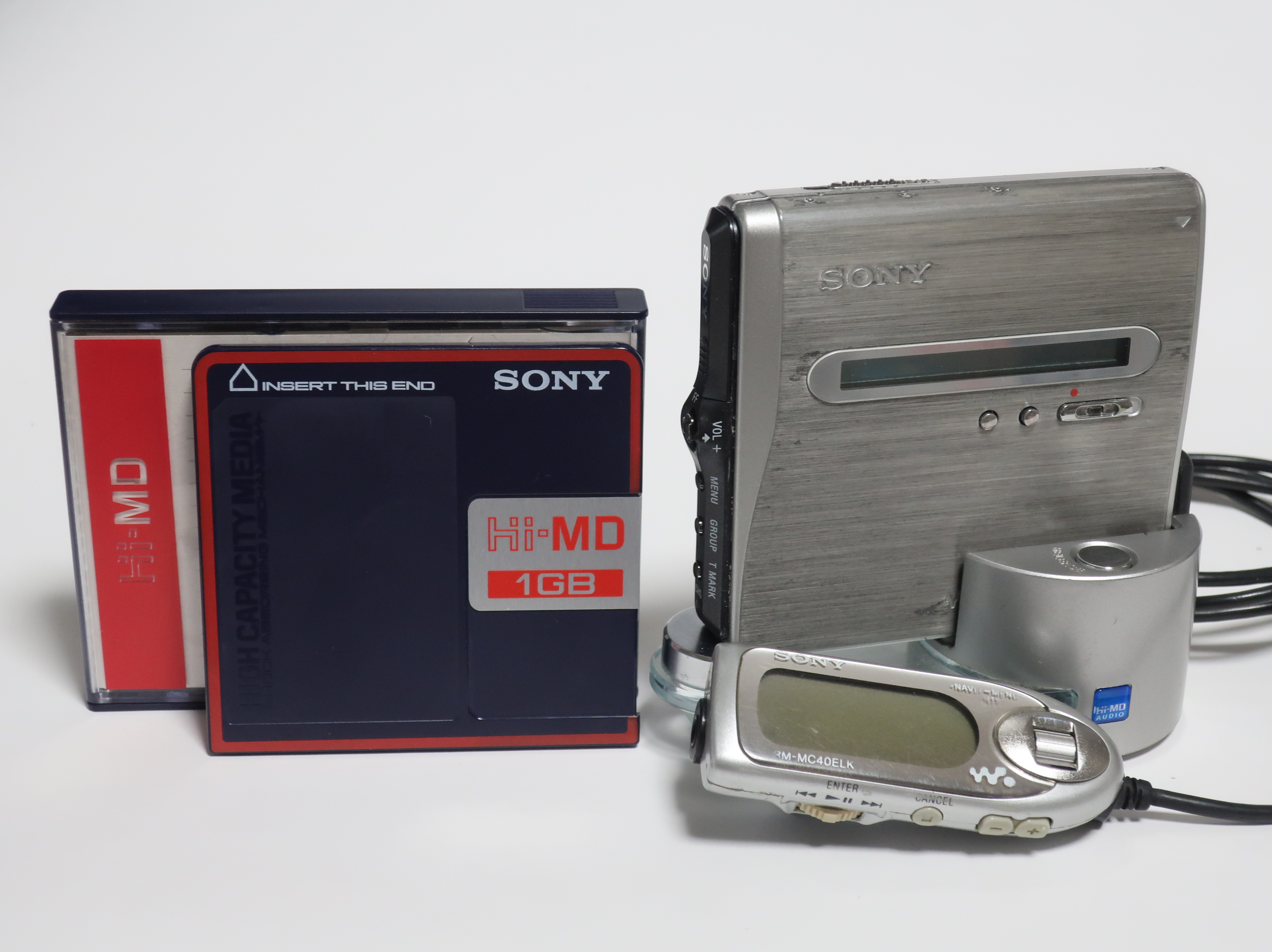
Hi-MD Walkman MZ-NH1 with blank Hi-MD

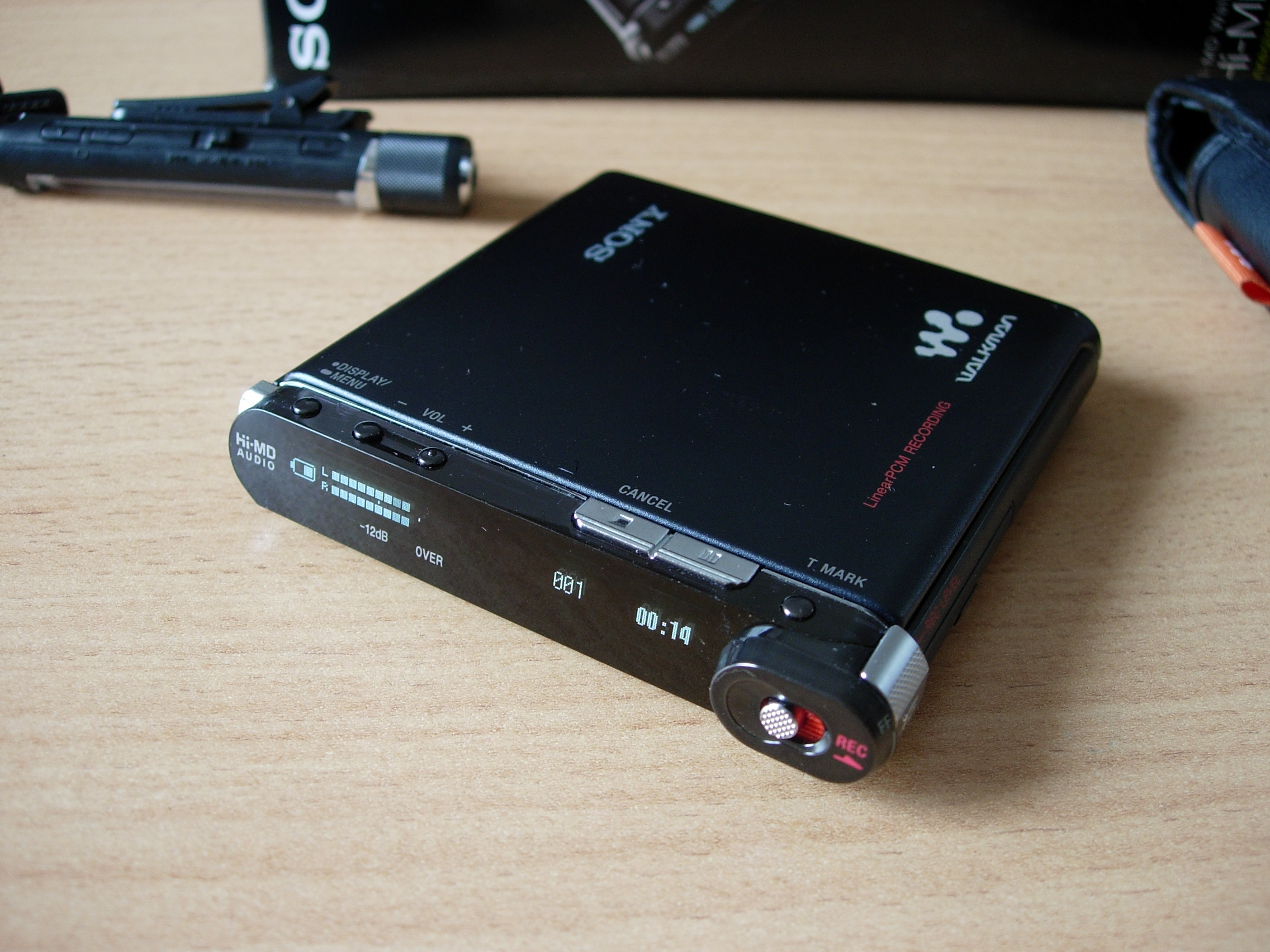
Sony MZ-RH1, the last Hi-MD Walkman by Sony

== See also ==
- OpenMG
