= Magneto-optical drive =

Computer drive that uses removable MO media

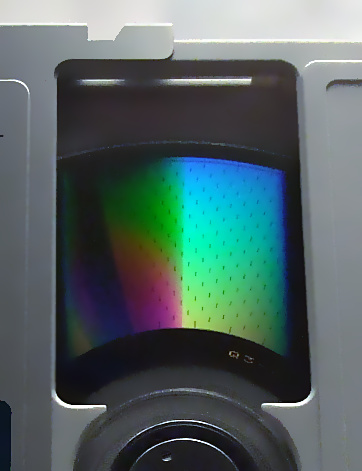
A Magneto-optical disc surface has sector partition rectangles.

A magneto-optical drive is a kind of optical disc drive capable of writing and rewriting data upon a magneto-optical disc. 130 mm (5.25 in) and 90 mm (3.5 in) discs are the most common sizes.

In 1983, just a year after the introduction of the compact disc, Kees Schouhamer Immink and Joseph Braat presented the first experiments with erasable magneto-optical compact discs during the 73rd AES Convention in Eindhoven. The technology was introduced commercially in 1985. Although optical, they normally appear as hard disk drives to an operating system and can be formatted with any file system. Magneto-optical drives were common in some countries, such as Japan, but have fallen into disuse.

== Overview ==
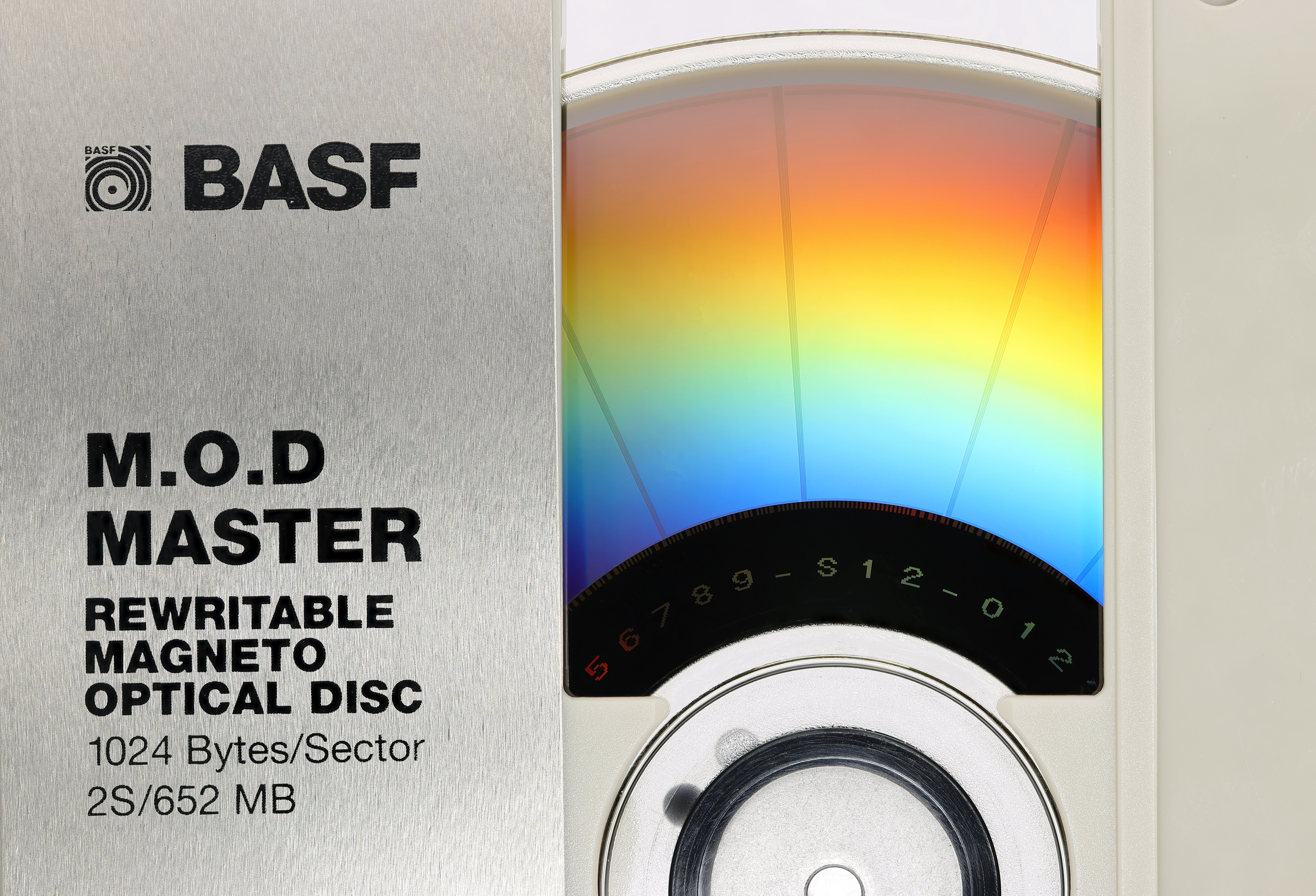
Visible sectors partition lines on a 130 mm 652 MB magneto-optical disk. (1024 user byte, 17 sectors per track).

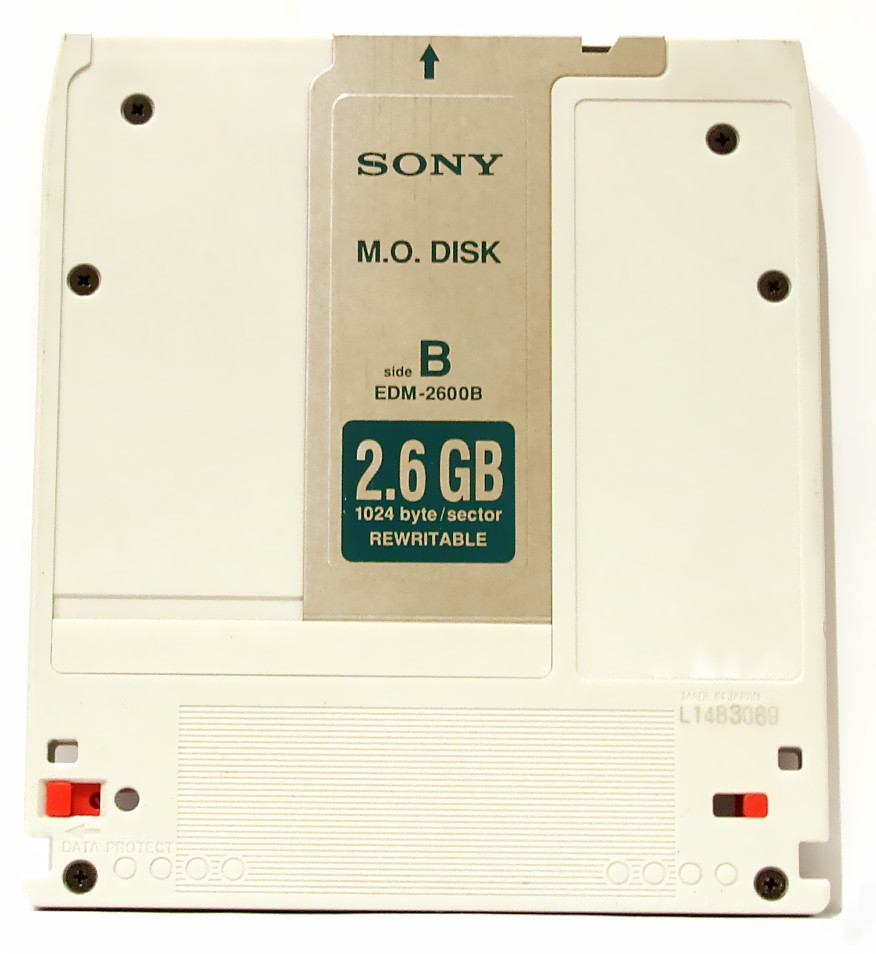
A 130 mm 2.6 GB magneto-optical disc

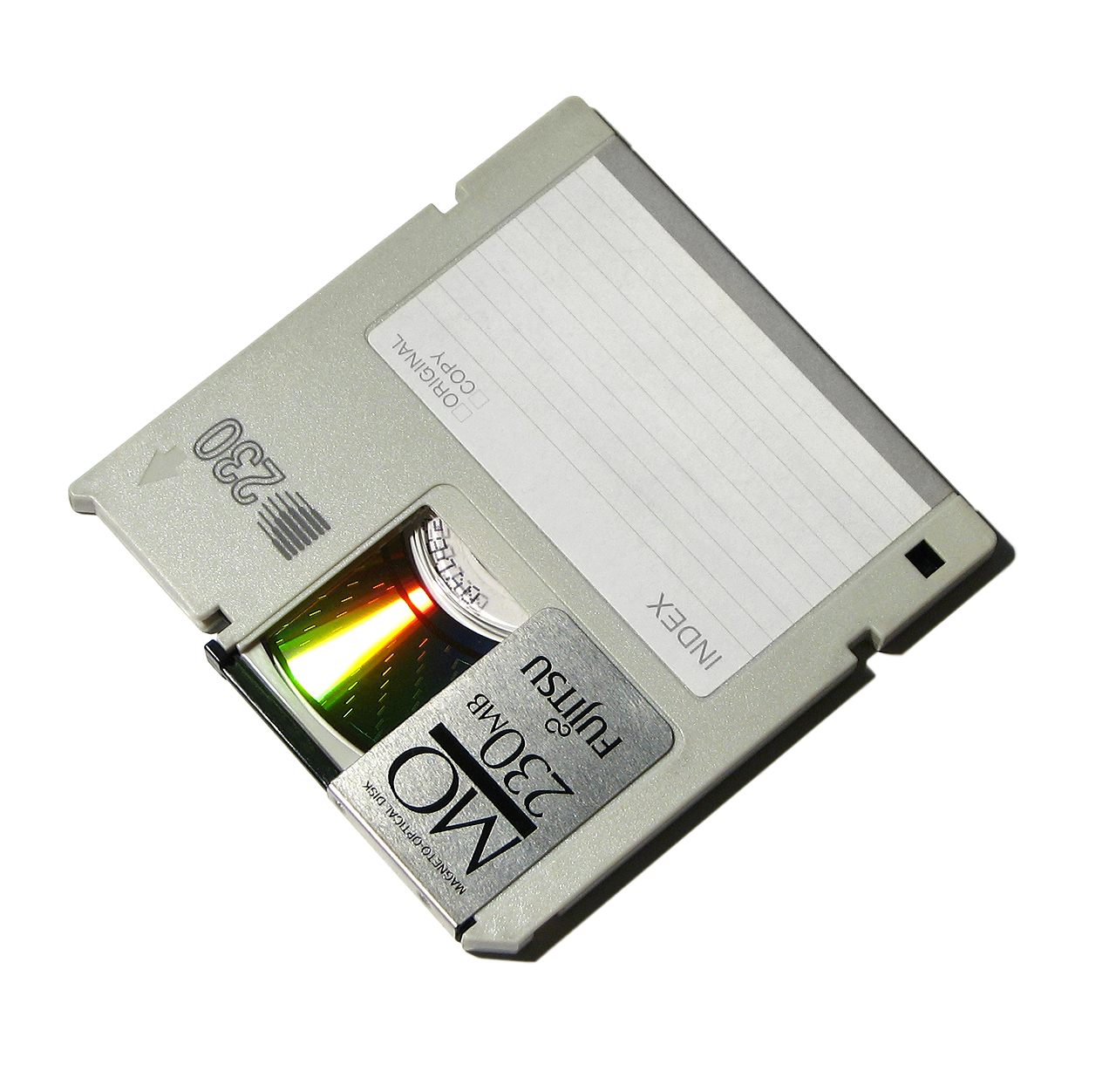
A 230 MB Fujitsu 90 mm magneto-optical disc.

Early drives are 130 mm and have the size of full-height 130 mm hard-drives (like in the IBM PC XT). 130 mm media looks similar to a CD-ROM enclosed in an old-style caddy, while 90 mm media is about the size of a regular 3 1/2-inch floppy disk, but twice the thickness. The cases provide dust resistance, and the drives themselves have slots constructed in such a way that they always appear to be closed. Original MO systems were WORM (write once, read many), and later systems were read/write.

The disc consists of a ferromagnetic material sealed beneath a plastic coating. The only physical contact is during recording, when a magnetic head is brought into contact with the side of the disc opposite to the laser, similar to Floptical drives, but not the same. During reading, a laser projects a beam on the disk and, according to the magnetic state of the surface, the reflected light varies due to the magneto-optic Kerr effect. During recording, laser power is increased to heat the material to the Curie point in a single spot. This enables an electromagnet positioned on the opposite side of the disc to change the local magnetic polarization. The polarization is retained after the temperature drops.

Each write cycle requires both a pass to erase a region and another pass to write information. Both passes use the laser to heat the recording layer; the magnetic field is used to change the magnetic orientation of the recording layer. The electromagnet reverses polarity for writing, and the laser is pulsed to record spots of 1 over the erased region of 0. As a result of this two-pass process, it takes twice as long to write data as it does to read it.

In 1990, a 300 mm disc with 7 GB capacity was made available.

In 1996, Direct Overwrite technology was introduced for 90 mm discs, eliminating the initial erase pass when writing. This requires special media.

By default, magneto-optical drives verify information after writing it to the disc, and are able to immediately report any problems to the operating system. This means writing can actually take three times longer than reading, but it makes the media extremely reliable, unlike the CD-R or DVD-R media upon which data is written without any concurrent data integrity checking. Using a magneto-optical disc is much more like using a diskette drive than a CD-RW drive.

During a read cycle, the laser is operated at a lower power setting, emitting polarized light. The reflected light has a change in Kerr rotation and Kerr ellipticity, which is measured by an analyzer and corresponds to either a logical 0 or 1.

The 130 mm drives have been available in capacities from 650 MB to 9.1 GB. However, this is split in half over both sides of the disk. The 2.6 GB disks, for example, have a formatted capacity of 1.2 GB per side. The 130 mm drives were always SCSI. The 90 mm discs had their entire capacity on one side, with no capability to flip them over. The 90 mm drives were produced in SCSI, IDE, and USB formats. Capacities ranged from 128 MB to 2.3 GB.

While they were never particularly popular with consumers (the main consumer market was the 90 mm drives), the 130 mm drives had some lasting service in corporate storage and retrieval. Optical libraries, such as the Hewlett Packard 40XT, were created to automate loading and storing of the disks. A self-contained unit holding 16 or more disks and connected by SCSI to a host computer, the library required specialized archival software to store indices of data and select disks. Popular uses were for legal document storage and medical imaging, where high reliability, long life, and (at the time) high storage capacity were required. The optical libraries could also be used manually on a Windows 2000/XP machine by selecting and ejecting discs under the Computer Management icon's Removable Storage Service, but this is cumbersome in practice.

=== LIMDOW ===
Light Intensity Modulated Direct OverWrite (LIMDOW) technology used a different write technology, which improved on the performance levels of earlier magneto-optical devices.

LIMDOW disks and drives worked on the same basic principle as a standard magneto-optical drive: the write surface is heated up and took on a magnetic force applied from outside. But instead of using a magnetic head in the drive to make the changes, the magnets were built into the disk itself.

The LIMDOW disk has two magnetic layers just behind the reflective writing surface. This write surface can take magnetism from one of those magnetic layers when it is heated up to one temperature; but if it is heated up further, it will take its polarity from the other magnetic layer. To write the data onto the disk, the magneto-optical drive's laser pulses between two powers.

At high power, the surface heats up more and takes its magnetic charge from the north pole magnetic layer. At lower power, it heats up less and takes its magnetic charge from the south pole layer. Thus, with LIMDOW, the magneto-optical write process has a single stage, improving write times.

Because the magnetic surface is adjacent to the writing surface, rather than somewhere outside the disk itself, the magnetic writing can be done at a higher resolution, including that of the resolution of the laser spot doing the heating up.

In the spring of 1997 Plasmon launched its DW260 drive, which used LIMDOW technology for a higher level of performance than previous magneto-optical drives. LIMDOW drives that shipped in the second half of 1997 had search speeds of less than 15 ms and data transfer rates in excess of 4 Mbit/s, which are fast enough for storing audio and streaming MPEG-2 video.

== Vendors ==
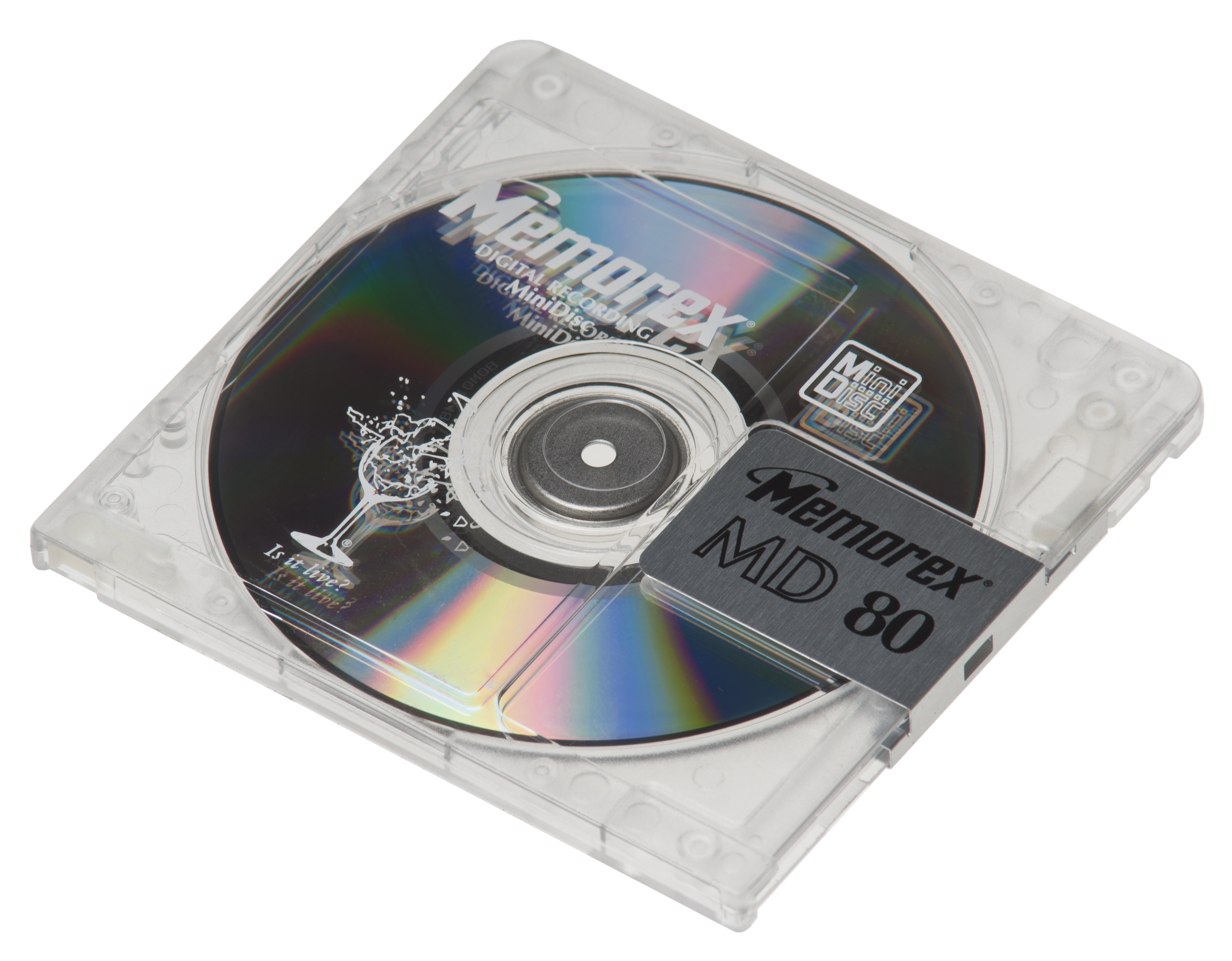
MiniDiscs are magneto-optical discs used to store music.

Magneto-optical drives were first offered in NeXT computers. They were later also offered in Canon products.

Sony MiniDiscs are magneto-optical, and Sony produces many other formats of magneto-optical media. As of February 2025 Sony has ceased production of all MiniDisc blank media. The world only has access to dwindling new stock from vendors on sites such as eBay or Amazon. TEAC & TASCAM continued to manufacture MiniDisc decks up until 2020 while Sony ceased production of hardware in 2013.

Pinnacle Micro was a major manufacturer of magneto-optical drives. 3.5-inch drives were 128 MB and 230 MB. 5.25-inch drives produced were 650 MB and 1.3 GB (Sierra), 2.6 GB (Vertex) and 4.6 GB (Apex). The Vertex and Apex were non-ISO standard drives and used proprietary media. Pinnacle Micro has ceased production of these products.

LMSI produced 5.25-inch magneto-optical drives as well.

Maxoptix, a spin-off of Maxtor Corp., was a major manufacturer of 130 mm or 5.25-inch magneto-optical drives. A current model is the T7-9100 drive, which has a maximum capacity of 9.1 GB and is downward read and write compatible with 5.2 GB, 4.8 GB, 4.1 GB, 2.6 GB, and 2.3 GB magneto-optical disks, and read compatible with 1.3 GB, 1.2 GB, 650 MB, and 600 MB magneto-optical disks. Popular older models of 5.25-inch Maxoptix MO drives are the T6 Star, T6-5200 and T5-2600 MO drives. Maxoptix was acquired by Techware Distribution in 2008.

Fujitsu was a major manufacturer of 90 mm magneto-optical drives, exceeding 2 GB in capacity, but they have discontinued production and sale of this product category.

PDO Konica Minolta was the last manufacturer of 90 mm 3.5-inch magneto-optical drives. They had a 3.5-inch 1.3 GB USB external pocket drive available for sale in the United States and Europe.

== Floptical drives ==
Magneto-optical drives are not Floptical drives, which likewise combine ferromagnetic and optical technologies, albeit in a different manner. Flopticals are 21-megabyte 3.5-inch magnetic diskettes using optical tracks to increase the tracking precision of the magnetic head, from the usual 135 tracks per inch to 1,250 tracks per inch. No laser or heating is involved; a simple infrared LED is used to follow the optical tracks, while a magnetic head touches the recording surface. The drives can also read and write traditional 3.5-inch diskettes, although not the 2.88 megabyte variety. Flopticals were manufactured by Insite Peripherals, a company founded by Jim Burke.

== Progress ==
At the Consumer Electronics Show in January 2004, Sony revealed a 1 gigabyte capacity MiniDisc called Hi-MD. Its recorders can also double the capacity of regular MiniDiscs with special formatting that renders the disc incompatible with other recorders.

As with all removable storage media, the advent of cheap CD and DVD drives and flash memory has made them largely obsolete. Magneto-optical disks in particular were expensive when new, with high reliability but slow writing. Magnetic tape formats like LTO have far surpassed MO media for high capacity enterprise-grade backup storage.

In 2016 a new phenomenon, magnetization melting by photoinduced photoconductors, was discovered in magnetic photoconductors. It was demonstrated that extremely low light intensities, in the range of 1 μWcm^{−2}, can be used to read/write magnetic information in femtosecond (10^{−15} s) timescales, allowing, in principle, high-speed, high-density data storage.

== See also ==
- Domain Wall Displacement Detection (DWDD), a magneto-optical reproducing technology developed by Canon Inc. and Sony
- Floptical
- Ultra Density Optical
