= 36Kr =

Chinese technology news website

36Kr Holdings Inc.
- Native name: 北京多氪信息科技有限公司
- Type: Public
- Traded as: Nasdaq: KRKR
- Industry: Media
- Founded: December 2010; 15 years ago
- Founder: Liu Chengcheng
- Headquarters: Beijing, China
- Key people: Feng Dagang (CEO)
- Revenue: ▲CN¥238.70 million (2023)
- Net income: ▼CN¥−89.25 million (2023)
- Total assets: ▼CN¥458.97 million (2023)
- Total equity: ▼CN¥261.86 million (2023)
- Number of employees: 481 (2023)
- Website: www.36kr.com

36Kr (Chinese: 36氪; pinyin: 36 Kè) is a publicly listed Chinese media company that focuses on technology and financial news. It also is a data provider for entrepreneurs and investors.

It has been referred to as China's equivalent of TechCrunch.

== Background ==
The origins of 36Kr can be traced to the new apps and gadgets tech blog written by Liu Chengcheng (刘成城), who was then a college student majoring in communication engineering at the Beijing University of Posts and Telecommunications. He then attended the University of the Chinese Academy of Sciences for a master's program in data mining.

By late 2010, 19 writers were regularly contributing to Liu's blog. It was then that Liu met Wang Xiao, one of the founders of Baidu, at a university alumni party. Wang offered to invest 300,000 yuan in his blog with Liu eventually accepting the money.

That year, Liu Chengcheng established 36Kr. Liu is a fan of Superman, who is from the planet Krypton. The element Krypton has the atomic number 36. Hence the company's name is named 36Kr.

In July 2011, 36kr launched 36tr which is a database which collected entrepreneurial projects. A few exclusive investors could access the database. Throughout 2012 more than 1,000 projects were put on 36tr.

36kr also launched 36kr+, a service platform that could provide resources to entrepreneurs.

In 2014, 36Kr launched Kr Space, a business incubator which later became a provider of co-working spaces. It drew comparisons to WeWork. In 2016, Kr Space was spun off as an independent business.

36Kr quickly expanded as more startups and investors went to the 36Kr site for news. In 2015, 36Kr launched a financing platform that connected entrepreneurs and investors. In 2016, 36Kr launched Jing Data, a subscription-based venture capital and private equity database. As 36Kr gained exposure, it obtained funding from investors such as Alibaba Group, Matrix Partners and e.ventures 36Kr was described as a sort of LinkedIn for Chinese startups.

By the end of 2017, 36Kr had amassed a global readership of more than 150 million and published a total of 50,000 stories online.

On 8 November 2019, 36Kr held its initial public offering by becoming a listed company on the Nasdaq raising $20 million. On its first day trading debut, its shares dropped 10%.

In March 2022, Ant Group, an affiliate of Alibaba Group which held 15.1% in 36Kr sold its entire stake in the company.
