= Liu Qiangdong =

Chinese Internet entrepreneur (born 1973)

- 刘强东
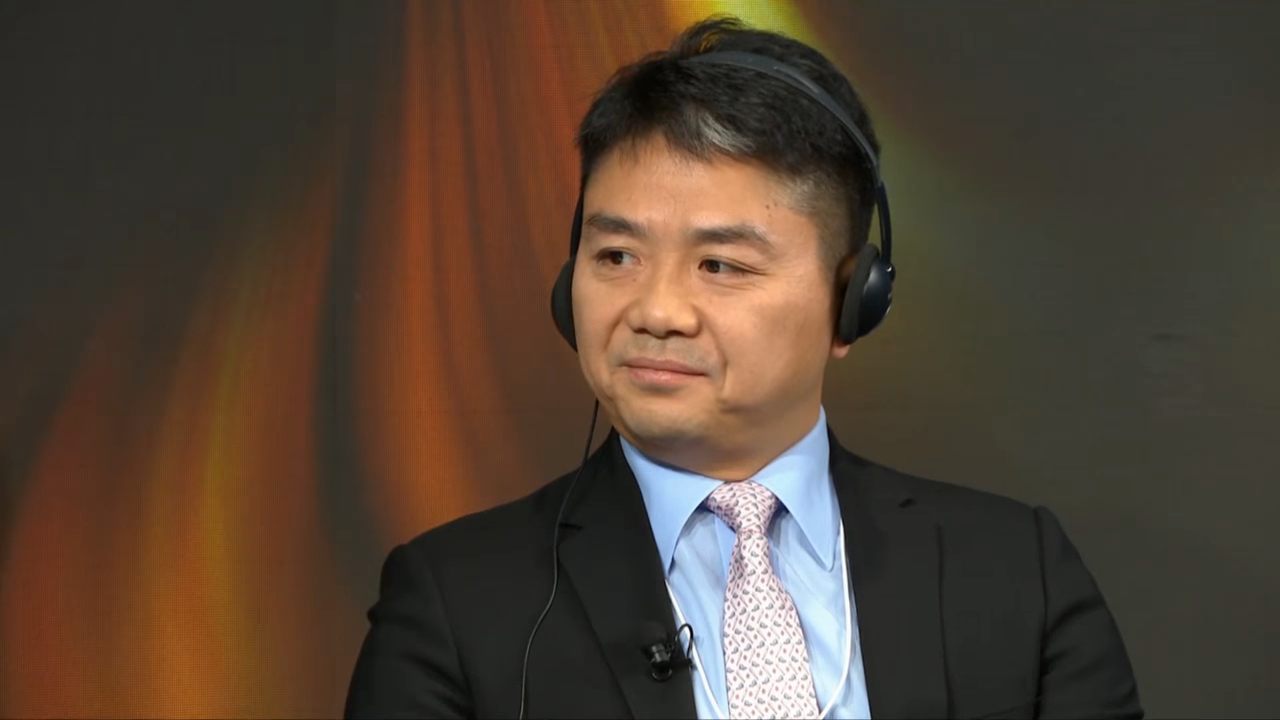
- Born: 10 March 1973 (age 53); Suqian, Jiangsu, China
- Education: Renmin University (LLB); China Europe International Business School (MBA)
- Occupations: Founder and chairman, JD.com
- Spouse: Zhang Zetian (m. 2015)
- Children: 2

Chinese name
- Traditional Chinese: 劉強東
- Simplified Chinese: 刘强东
Transcriptions
Standard Mandarin
- Hanyu Pinyin: Liú Qiángdōng
- Bopomofo: ㄌㄧㄡˊㄑㄧㄤˊㄉㄨㄥ
- Tongyong Pinyin: Liu QiangDong

Liu Qiangdong (Richard) (Chinese: 刘强东; born March 10, 1973) is a Chinese Internet entrepreneur. Liu founded JD Multimedia as a business-to-consumer single retail store for magneto-optical products in June 1998 and later moved the company into an e-commerce website known as JD.com (also known as Jingdong) in 2013.

Liu is the company's former chief executive officer and now chairman, expanding its e-commerce products from selling consumer electronics to less specialized items. Under his leadership, JD.com has become the largest retailer in China. As of October 2026, Forbes estimates Liu’s net worth at US$5.5 billion.

== Early life and education ==
Liu Qiangdong was born on March 10, 1973, in Suqian, Jiangsu province. He graduated from primary school in the Jiangsu province and enrolled in the department of sociology in the Renmin University of China 1992. He graduated from Renmin University with a Bachelor of Laws with a major in sociology in 1996. He received an executive Master of Business Administration from China Europe International Business School in Shanghai.

As a college student, Liu invested his income earned from programming work and family loans into a restaurant venture. The business failed in a few months, losing more than RMB200,000, which left Liu in debt.

== Career ==
After graduation, Liu was employed by Japan Life, a Japanese health product enterprise, and successively served as the director for computers, the director for business, and the logistics supervisor.

In June 1998, he started his own business Jingdong in Zhongguancun Industrial Park in Beijing as a distributor of magneto-optical products, focusing on selling authorized products when counterfeit products were widely sold. Liu opened 12 brick-and-mortar stores under the Jingdong brand by 2003.

The SARS outbreak in 2003 kept staff and clients of Jingdong at home and forced Liu to rethink the business model and divert to online business. Due to the outbreak, Liu's business lost over 8 million yuan. Liu launched his first online retail website in 2004, and founded JD.com (short form for Jingdong) later that year. In 2005, Liu closed off all brick-and-mortar stores and became an e-commerce business.

In 2005, Liu received an offer to sell JD.com for 18 million yuan, which he rejected.

In 2007, Liu employed a full-category strategy for JD.com, changing the company's business model from selling consumer electronics to large variety of goods. The company has become one of the leading e-commerce businesses in China. JD.com has been compared to Amazon because of similar business models, and Liu has been compared to Jeff Bezos as a self-made individual.

JD.com applied to go public in the US in January 2014. Liu raised $1.8 billion with a public listing on the Nasdaq in May the same year, and JD.com became the largest IPO for a Chinese internet company traded in New York. On 22 May 2014, the stock price rose about 15%. JD.com is the third largest internet-company in the world (by revenue) and is the largest e-commerce company in China.

In April 2022, Lei Xu became CEO of JD.com, and Liu stepped into the role of chairman, continuing to focus on the company's long-term strategies. Sandy Ran Xu became CEO of JD.com in May 2023.

During a livestream in April 2024, JD.com introduced an AI digital representative of Liu, nicknamed "procurement and sales manager Brother Dong (采销东哥)." Liu's avatar appeared in both JD Home Appliances and JD Supermarket's livestreaming rooms, attracting over 20 million views within the first hour and generating RMB 50 million in sales throughout the entire livestream.

== Philanthropy ==
In 2008, Liu volunteered as part of Red Cross efforts and drove to Pingwu County to help the victims of the Sichuan earthquake.

In 2013, when JD.com was relatively small with "only 38 employees," Liu and the company went to Jingle County in Shanxi to sponsor the education of underprivileged children.

In April 2020, Liu and Zhang Zetian announced a donation through the China Charity Federation that included 5 million masks, 50 invasive ventilators and more than 600,000 pieces of protective medical supplies to the UK. That same month, Liu donated over 160,000 pieces of medical supplies to Uzbekistan as well as 800,000 masks to Chile.

In February 2022, Liu pledged to donate his JD.com shares, currently worth $2.3 billion, to charity. Later that year, Liu personally donated 100 million RMB, which was matched by the company and its subsidiaries, to a housing security and relief fund that will provide for the families of JD.com employees in the event of the employees' death or injury.

Liu and his wife Zhang Zetian established the Tian-Qiang Charitable Fund. The Fund co-launched a children's books donation campaign "Starlight Transmission" program in 2023, which has donated books to more than 100 primary schools in rural areas.

== Personal life ==
In August 2015, Liu Qiangdong married Zhang Zetian. Their relationship started in early 2014 when Liu studied at Columbia University and Zhang was an exchange student at Barnard College, affiliated with Columbia University.

Growing up, his family lived in poverty. Liu and his wife, Zhang Zetian, returned to his hometown Suqian for the 2015 Spring Festival, gifting over 650 elderly villagers with red envelopes. They have continued this tradition, sending regular Spring Festival gift packages filled with food, clothing and daily necessities to the villagers.

On August 31, 2018, Liu was arrested in Minneapolis, Minnesota, with the charge of rape. The local police found "no substance to the claim against Mr. Liu". Despite this, three law firms filed class-action lawsuits against JD.com, alleging that the company "failed to disclose pertinent information" about Liu's arrest. Liu's attorneys denied any wrongdoing and claimed that the charges are not supported by evidence.

On April 16, 2019, a student at the University of Minnesota, formally filed a civil lawsuit against Liu Qiangdong, claiming he sexually assaulted her. In 2022, a settlement was reached, and the situation was handled outside of court.

In 2024, Liu initiated the "Sending New Year's Gifts to Villagers" campaign, ordering over 1000 down jackets and gift boxes to LaiLongzhen, Suqian. These goods reached over 1,300 households in Guangming Village, his hometown.

Business positions
New title	CEO of Jingdong; 2005–2022	Succeeded by Xu Lei (徐雷)
