= JD.com =

Chinese e-commerce company

JD.com, Inc.

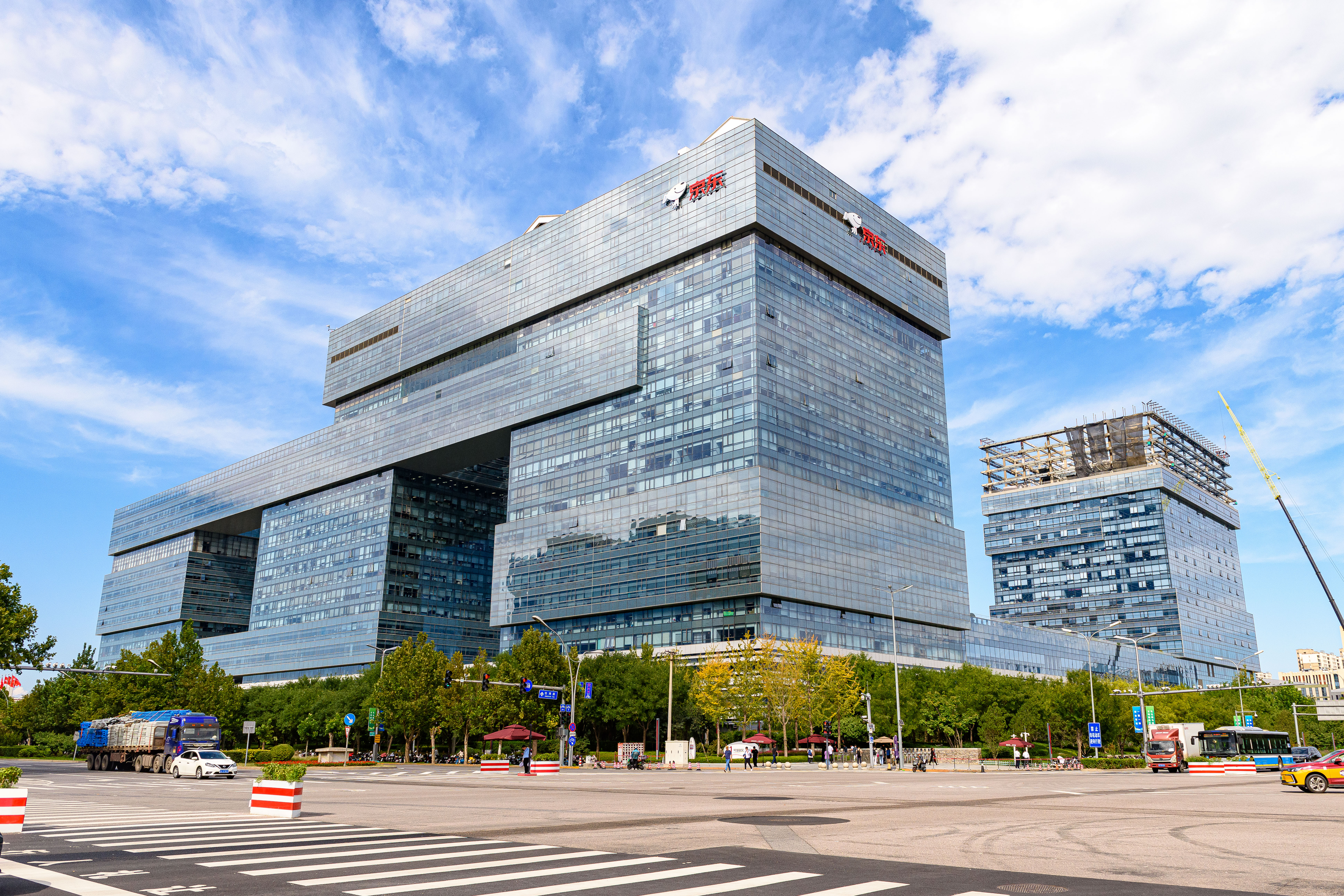
- Corporate headquarters in Beijing
- Native name: 京东
- Formerly: 360Buy
- Type: Public
- Traded as: Nasdaq: JD; SEHK: 9618
- Industry: E-commerce; Retail; Logistics; Internet
- Founded: 6 June 1998; 28 years ago
- Founder: Liu Qiangdong
- Headquarters: Beijing, China
- Area served: Worldwide
- Key people: Sandy Ran Xu (CEO); Liu Qiangdong (Chairman)
- Services: Online shopping; Logistics and supply chain management; Digital healthcare and pharmacy; JD Cloud; JD Technology
- Revenue: ▲CN¥1.31 trillion (2025) (US$195.42 billion)
- Operating income: ▼CN¥2.8 billion (2025) (US$417.97 million)
- Net income: ▼CN¥19.6 billion (2025) (US$2.93 billion)
- Total assets: ▼CN¥225.4 billion (2025) (US$33.65 billion)
- Total equity: ▼CN¥293.78 billion (2025) (US$43.85 billion)
- Owner: Liu Qiangdong (15.8%); Tencent (2.3%)
- Number of employees: ▲776,682 (2025)
- Website: corporate.jd.com

JD.com, Inc., also known as Jingdong Group (Chinese: 京东集团; pinyin: Jīngdōng Jítuán), formerly called 360buy, is a Chinese multinational technology company specializing in e-commerce, retail, Internet, and technology. The company is headquartered in Beijing. With revenues more than US$194 billion in 2025, JD.com is China's largest retailer by revenue, and ranks 47 on Fortune Global 500. It is one of the two massive B2C online retailers in China by transaction volume and revenue, and is a major competitor to Alibaba-run Tmall. JD.com's portfolio spans across retail, technology, logistics, health care, industrials, property management, private label, insurance, and international business.

The company was founded by Liu Qiangdong on 18 June 1998, and its retail platform went online in 2004. It originally sold magneto-optical products, but soon diversified, selling a wide range of electronics, including mobile phones, computers, and similar items among others. The company changed its domain name to 360buy.com in June 2007 and then to JD.com in 2013. At the same time, JD.com announced its new logo and mascot.

== History ==
=== Early years ===
The company was founded in 1998 as Jingdong, which was named after Liu Qiangdong's then girlfriend Gong Xiaojing and himself.

In 2004, the company's B2C site went online as jdlaser.com. The company began using the domain name 360buy.com, and the name was changed to Jingdong Mall in 2007.

In 2007, JD.com established an in-house logistics department in order to provide more reliable and timely delivery service to consumers.

Since 2009, JD.com has set up a customer service center in Suqian, cumulatively investing over 30 billion RMB to build its self-operated customer service center. As a result, the company now operates the industry's largest customer service team.

On 10 December 2010, JD's founder Liu Qiangdong announced through his Weibo account that every book sold on JD.com would be priced at 20 percent cheaper than its competitors. On December 14, 2010, Dangdang also began to offer discounts to customers and stated that the company would invest 40 million Chinese yuan to give discounts to customers. As a result, JD.com launched the second promotion to sell books at a lower price than Dangdang and announced that it would give coupons instead of reducing prices to protect the benefits of publishers. In November 2011, JD.com provided its customers with a 10 percent discount on books, while Dangdang sent promotional messages to its users. The sudden increase of orders not only caused network errors but also postponed transits of books.

JD.com started the e-book selling business online on 20 February 2012, and provided customers with more than 80,000 electronic books. On 17 April 2013, most of the e-books on Dangdang's website were free for users to download. Consequently, Dangdang launched its flagship store on JD.com in 2023.

In 2013, the company's domain name was changed to JD.com. In the same year, the website announced its new logo and its cartoon dog mascot, Joy.

=== Listing ===
In 2014, JD.com's Nasdaq IPO raised $1.8 billion USD, valuing the company at approximately $26 billion and making it the largest Chinese company to be listed only in the United States.

In 2015, JD.com launched its Russian site aimed to expand its business globally.

In November 2017, JD.com achieved a sales record of US$19.1 billion. In February 2018, it released its spin-off JD Finance, raising $2.1 billion in a capital raise.

In April 2020, the company confidentially filed for a second listing in Hong Kong and began trading on the Hong Kong Stock Exchange for HK$239 in June 2020.

In 2020, JD.com announced that would be investing $830 million in its JD Health unit, provided by private equity firm Hillhouse Capital. In December 2020, JD Health's $3.5 billion IPO was Hong Kong's largest initial public offering of the year.

In 2021, JD Logistics, the supply chain management and logistics delivery arm of JD.com, raised HK$24.6 billion ($3.2 billion USD) for its initial public offering, which was the second-largest IPO in 2021. Shares rose by 18% on its first day of trading.

=== Recent years ===
In May 2023, Sandy Ran Xu, who had served as JD.com’s chief financial officer since 2020, became the company’s chief executive officer and an executive director, succeeding Lei Xu. She was the third CEO in JD.com’s history and the first woman to hold the position.

In October 2023, JD.com began a 4-hour delivery service in Hong Kong.

In September 2024, JD.com launched its global sales business in the United States, Japan, Singapore, and Malaysia.

In July 2025, JD.com agreed to acquire German electronics retailer Ceconomy, parent of MediaMarkt and Saturn, for US$2.5 billion (€2.2 billion). By November 2025, JD.com had successfully secured a majority stake of over 70% in the company. The acquisition was completed on November 12, 2026.

On September 13, 2025, JD.com was in advanced talks to acquire British catalogue retailer Argos from Sainsbury's, but discussions ended a day later with Sainsbury's keeping Argos after JD.com communicated it would only engage on materially revised terms.

In early 2026, JD.com's aggressive European retail expansion faced mixed regulatory responses. While the German government allowed the Ceconomy takeover to proceed without intervention, France formally blocked JD.com's attempted acquisition of the French electronics chain Fnac Darty in January 2026 to prevent it from becoming a direct sales channel for Chinese goods. Furthermore, in March 2026, the Ceconomy acquisition encountered serious regulatory resistance in Austria under national investment control laws, prompting JD.com to resubmit its application with enhanced legal commitments regarding data protection and the preservation of local jobs.

== Subsidiaries ==
=== JD Retail ===
JD Retail, the company's retail infrastructure provider, offers products and services in five major sectors: home appliances & furnishings, digital products, supermarket, life services, automotive products and services, fashion & luxury goods – along with independent divisions, such as local retailing and enterprise services.

JD Worldwide, its cross-border e-commerce platform, enables and supports international brands and merchants to sell directly to Chinese consumers without requiring an established presence in China.

JD.com opened its first chain of omnichannel supermarkets 7Fresh in January 2018.

In May 2024, JD NOW announced an on-demand rapid delivery time as fast as nine minutes for products from over 500,000 stores across 2,300 locations in China.

In August 2024, JD.com expanded its apparel branch, JD Fashion, with an investment of RMB 1 billion ($141 million USD). JD Fashion has partnered with Louis Vuitton, Dior, Bulgari, and Givenchy.

=== Cecomony ===
In July 2025, JD.com agreed to acquire Ceconomy for €2.2 billion.. The Bundeskartellamt (Federal Cartel Office of Germany) assessed in September 2025 that the competitive effects of a proposed merger were negligible and cleared the acquisition. In May 2026 the Directorate-General for Competition of the European Commission started own proceedings regarding subsidies under the foreign trade law.. Regulatory clearance was given on 3 November 2026, and the acquisition was completed on 12 November 2026, with JD.com owning 85.2% of Ceconomy stock.

=== Joybuy ===
In March 2026, JD.com launched Joybuy, its European online retail business, in the United Kingdom, Germany, France, the Netherlands, Belgium and Luxembourg.

The launch formed part of JD.com’s expansion outside China and was described by news organisations as an attempt to compete with Amazon and other established ecommerce companies in Europe.

Joybuy started operating as a first-party retailer, purchasing and holding much of the inventory it sells. At launch, it sold products across categories including technology, appliances, beauty, homeware and groceries, including products from international brands.

In June 2026, it was reported that Joybuy was testing a marketplace service to sell products third-party products as stock, from both European and international brands.

JD.com developed its own European warehousing and last-mile delivery infrastructure to support Joybuy. At the time of its launch, its logistics network comprised more than 60 warehouses and depots across Europe, including a 90,000-square-metre fulfillment center in Oberhausen, Germany.

In the United Kingdom, its logistics infrastructure included warehouses in Milton Keynes and Luton.

In eligible metropolitan areas across its active markets, Joybuy offered same-day delivery for orders placed before 11 a.m. and next-day delivery for orders placed before 11 p.m.

In France, Les Échos reported that Joybuy’s French website received approximately 1.8 million visitors in March 2026 and 1.2 million in April, citing data from Médiamétrie.

=== JD Logistics ===
In 2016, JD.com started testing autonomous delivery services and building drone delivery airports, as well as operating driverless delivery by unveiling its first autonomous truck in 2017. In 2017, JD.com established JD Logistics (also known as JINGDONG Logistics) to provide smart supply chain and logistics services.

JD Logistics plans to double its overseas warehouse space by 2025. It currently operates nearly 100 bonded, direct mail, and overseas warehouses spanning 10 million square feet.

=== JD Health ===
JD Health provides digital health services and resources. It is the healthcare unit of JD.com.

In May 2019, JD.com announced the establishment of JD Health as a subsidiary for independent operations in the healthcare business.

=== JD Technology ===
In 2021, the company announced that it had sold JD Cloud, its cloud computing services, to its financial technology unit, JD Digits, for a combined valuation of 15.7 billion yuan ($2.4 billion USD).

In July 2023, JD.com unveiled its ChatRhino (or Yanxi, 言犀 in Chinese) large language model (LLM), tailored to serve various industries. By combining 70% generalized data with 30% native intelligent supply chain data, it offers targeted solutions for real industry challenges across sectors such as retail, logistics, finance, health, and city.

=== Ochama ===
In January 2022, JD.com launched its Europe-based omnichannel retail brand, Ochama in the Netherlands. It operates automated warehouses in the Netherlands, Poland, and France. Ochama allows shoppers to either collect online orders from any of its designated pick-up points or have them delivered directly to their homes. Its delivery service has expanded to 24 countries across the continent, and it has also introduced 1-hour express delivery in Amsterdam.

In August 2025, Ochama in the Netherlands was officially rebranded as Joybuy, as part of JD.com's broader European repositioning strategy.

=== JINGDONG Industrials ===
JINGDONG Industrials is an industrial supply chain technology and service provider under JD.com. The company initially filed for an initial public offering in Hong Kong in March 2023 and refiled its second IPO application in October 2024 after its first attempt failed due to lackluster market conditions.

=== JINGDONG Property ===
JINGDONG Property is the real estate development, leasing, management, and fund management subsidiary of JD.com.

== Corporate affairs ==
The key trends for JD.com are (as of the financial year ending 31 December):

	Revenue (USD billion)	EBITA (USD billion)
2015	28.69	(1.45)
2016	38.87	(0.49)
2017	54.16	0.31
2018	69.25	(0.21)
2019	83.29	2.10
2020	108.95	7.67
2021	147.29	(0.24)
2022	154.72	2.26
2023	152.94	4.86
2024	160.80	7.57

== Collaborations and former partnerships ==
Joy & Heron - animated promotional video by JD.com released under CC license

Tencent acquired a 15% stake in JD.com in 2014 by paying cash and handing over its e-commerce businesses Paipai & QQ Wanggou plus a stake in Yixun to JD.com, to build a stronger competitor to Alibaba Group Holding Ltd. After it opened in 2015 and offered competition to Alibaba's e-commerce sites, it jumped into foreign sales. Their competition was often touted as a 'cat and dog war', with Alibaba at 59% and JD at 23% B2C share.JD.com's competitive edge was that it possessed an in-house logistics network, unlike Alibaba which mostly depended upon third-party couriers through Cainiao, JD owned warehouses and delivery infrastructure.JD.com was able to create same day-delivery in many cities across China with an internal network. More recently, in 2026, the two were competing in food delivery services, with JD.com facing a Q4 loss, its first in nearly four years. In 2015, JD.com and Tencent announced the launch of the "Jingteng Plan" (Chinese: 京腾计划), a portmanteau of the two companies' names, which allows merchants to establish a brand and promote marketing effectiveness by linking JD.com consumption data with Tencent social data.

Walmart sold its Chinese e-Commerce business Yihaodian to JD.com in 2016 in exchange for a 5.9% equity stake valued at $1.5 billion. In October, Walmart filed 13G, revealing it nearly doubled its stake in JD.com to 10.9% In February 2017, Walmart increased investment in JD.com to 289.1 million shares, or 12.1%. In April, JD.com participated in the Salone del Mobile, featuring the installation Matrix, at the Università Statale of Milan. JD.com and Walmart launched the first annual JD-Walmart 8 August shopping festival in July. Walmart sold its approximate $3.7 billion stake in JD.com in August 2024; the companies have noted that they will continue commercial cooperation.

In January 2018, JD.com invested in Vietnam's online retail service tiki.vn for $50 million. In February, JD.com invested in France & the UK. Metcash partnered with JD.Com in May 2018 to sell groceries in China.

On 4 September 2018, JD.com signed a strategic agreement with Ruyi. Based on this partnership, JD and Ruyi will jointly establish fashion and lifestyle concept stores in core cities, such as Shanghai and Beijing.

In January 2022, JD.com partnered with Shopify to begin selling Shopify's brands via its cross-border e-commerce site in China.

In March 2024, JD.com partnered with Geopost to develop "comprehensive shipping solutions" between China and Europe. Additionally, its partnership with Evri allows European businesses to access JD.com's marketplace, connecting them with Chinese consumers.

== ESG ==
In 2017, JD.com established an anti-corruption coalition with other Chinese internet companies which aims to blacklist individuals engaged in illicit behavior from seeking employment elsewhere in the internet sector.

In 2017, JD Logistics launched the "Green Stream Initiative," which aims at exploring carbon reduction in its supply chain. In 2020, the initiative partnered with over 200,000 merchants. It has reduced plastic waste by 50,000 tons and paper waste by 1.3 million tons.

In September 2017, JD.com committed to further develop China's parcel delivery efficiency, investing US$101 million to subsidize merchants on JD.com for warehousing and distribution costs, for the upcoming 2017 Singles' Day.

In 2022, JD Logistics launched the "Delivered with Original Package" (DWOP) certification, the industry's first standard for original direct packaging on the same day. JD Logistics partnered with brands to ensure that over 80% of packages sold via e-commerce channels are DWOP compliant by 2030.

JD.com launched its Green Impact Initiative in May 2022, a program which labels eco-friendly products and allows customers to collect "green credits" to use for redeeming products on JD's app.

In late 2022, JD upgraded its "Housing Guarantee Fund" for employees with an investment of RMB 10 billion. Since 2023, 77% of the fund's applicants have been frontline workers; JD.com provides support to frontline employees, including social insurance, education, and housing funds.

== See also ==
- JD Gaming, JD.com's esports division
- JD Health
- JD Logistics
