= Toshiba Samsung Storage Technology =

Company

Toshiba Samsung Storage Technology Corporation
- Type: Storage Technologies
- Industry: Data storage
- Founded: 1 April 2004; 22 years ago
- Headquarters: Shibaura, Minato, Tokyo, Japan
- Key people: Hiroshi Suzuki (President & CEO)
- Products: Optical disc drives
- Owner: Optis Co., Ltd.

Toshiba Samsung Storage Technology Corporation (abbreviated TSST) is a former international joint venture company of Toshiba (Japan) and Samsung Electronics (South Korea). Toshiba used to own 51% of its stock, while Samsung used to own the remaining 49%. The company specialized in optical disc drive manufacturing. The company was established in 2004.

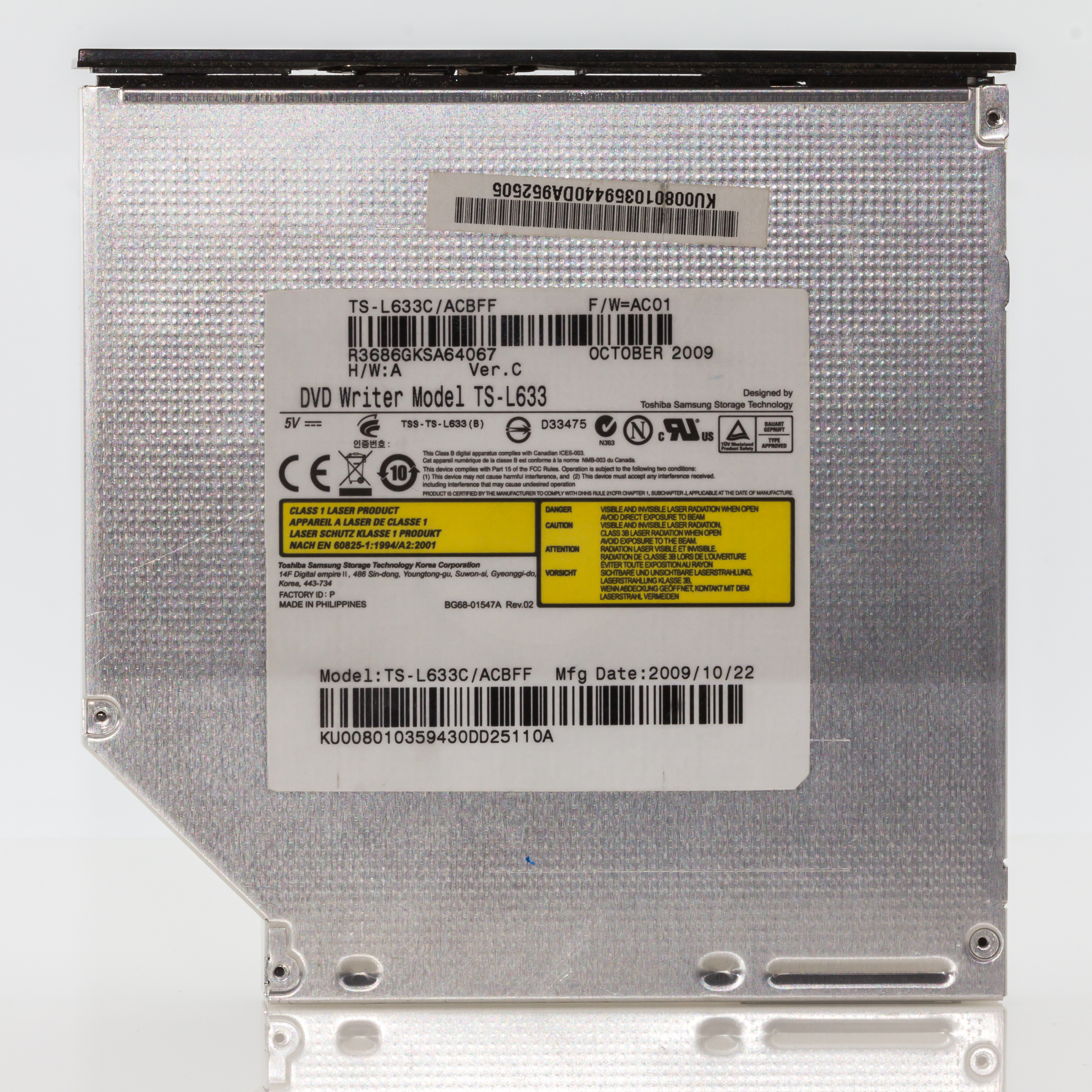
A slimline DVD Writer (TS-L633)

The company's headquarters is located in Shibaura, Minato, Tokyo, Japan with Hiroshi Suzuki as its president and CEO. Its subsidiary, Toshiba Samsung Storage Technology Korea Corporation is located in Suwon, South Korea, and headed by Dae Sung Kim.

Each corporation in Japan and Korea has the individual directorate system. For the business issues, TSST has been discussing it through the common relevant organization for mutual consent. TSST is currently responsible for the product development, marketing and sales, and has been taking advantage of the existing network of Samsung Electronics and Toshiba for manufacturing, sales, and after-sales service.

Half-height optical drives by TSSTcorp with writing abilities are branded "WriteMaster".

== History ==
In October 2009, TSST had received a subpoena from the U.S. Justice Department for possibly violating the antitrust laws.

Samsung and Toshiba sold their stakes in TSST to Optis Co., Ltd., a Korean manufacturer that made products for TSST under contract.

In mid-2016 TSST entered Chapter 15 bankruptcy protection in Delaware US, shielding it from most U.S. creditor actions while the company reorganizes its business in Korea's court system and restructures a $78 million debt.

== Models and specifications ==
All reading speeds are in constant angular velocity unless otherwise indicated.

"?" indicates that the format is supported, but the speed specification is unknown for this model.

Functionality not listed in "Additional functionality" (e.g. CD-MRW support) for a particular model does not always imply that the feature is missing, but may also imply that existing sources have not confirmed that feature for that particular model yet.

=== Half-height ===
Model numbers with the third digit being a "2" stands for a Parallel ATA + Integrated drive electronics (IDE) interface, while the digit "3" stands for a Serial ATA (SATA) interface. DVD writers by TSST may have a "WriteMaster" branding.

Some models such as the SH-S162 and the SH-S182 have "L" variants (SH-S162L and SH-S182L) respectively, which indicates support for LightScribe technology.

Writing speeds higher than ×16 (constant angular velocity) are only unlocked on quality recordable media from selected manufacturers, including Mitsubishi/Verbatim and Taiyo Yuden.

Model	Release date	Loading mechanism	Reading speeds					Writing speeds					Additional functionality
Model	Release date	Loading mechanism	CD-ROM, CD-R, CD-RW, Audio CD (Note: On both half-height and slim-type drives by TSST, reading speeds of Video CDs is oddly limited to 16× CAV.)	DVD-ROM, DVD±R, DVD±RW (single layer)	DVD-ROM, DVD-R, DVD+R (dual layer)	DVD-RAM (P-CAV)	Blu-ray disc	CD-R, CD-RW (Note: CD-RWs with speed ratings higher than 16× are written in Z-CLV zones of 16×CLV, 24×CLV and 32×CLV, of which the highest level depends on the speed specification of the particular CD-RW media used.)	DVD±R, DVD-RW, DVD+RW (single layer) (Note: DVD-RWs rated for 6× are written in Z-CLV zones of 4×CLV and 6×CLV for drive models until 2006, and entirely in 6×CLV for drive models since 2007.)	DVD-R, DVD+R (dual layer)	DVD-RAM	Blu-ray disc	Additional functionality
SH-M522 TS-H492C	2004	Mechanical tray	52×, 40×, 40×, ?	16×, ?, ?	?	?	None	52×, 32×	None	None	None	None	
TS-H352 SD-616	2005	Mechanical tray	48×, ?, ?, ?	16×, ?, ?	?	?	None	None	None	None	None	None	
SH-S162	2006	Mechanical tray	48×, 40×, 40×, 40×	12×, 8×, 8×	8×, 6×, 6×	5×P-CAV	None	48×(CAV), 32×(P-CAV)	16×, 4×, 4×	4×, 8×	5× P-CAV	None	LightScribe variant
SH-S182/ TS-H652 SH-S183	2006	Mechanical tray	48×, 40×, 40×, 40×	16×, 12×, 8×	8×, 8×, 8×	12×P-CAV	None	48×(CAV), 32×(P-CAV)	18×, 6×, 8×	4×, 8×	12× P-CAV	None	LightScribe variant, CD-MRW support
SE-S184M (external)	2006	Mechanical tray	48×, 40×, 40×, 40×	16×, 12×, 8×	8×, 8×, 8×	12×P-CAV	None	48×(CAV), 32×(P-CAV)	18×, 6×, 8×	4×, 8×	12× P-CAV	None	LightScribe variant, CD-MRW support
SH-S202 SH-S203D TS-H653B	2007	Mechanical tray	48×, 40×, 40×, 40×	16×, 16×, 12×	12×, 12×, 12×	12×P-CAV	None	48×(CAV), 32×(P-CAV)	20×, 6×, 8×	12×, 16×	12× P-CAV	None	LightScribe variant, CD-MRW support
SH-S222 SH-S223	2008	Mechanical tray	48×, 40×, 40×, 40×	16×, 16×, 12×	12×, 12×, 12×	12×P-CAV	None	48×(CAV), 32×(P-CAV)	22×, 6×, 8×	12×, 16×	12× P-CAV	None	LightScribe variant, CD-MRW support
SH-224DB	2013	Mechanical tray	48×, 40×, 40×, 40×	16×, 16×, 12×	12×, 12×, 12×	5×P-CAV	None	48×(CAV), 24×(Z-CLV)	24×, 6×, 8×	8×, 8×	5× P-CAV	None	
SH-B083L	2009	Mechanical tray	48×, 40×, 40×, 40×	16×, 16×, 12×	12×, 12×, 12×	12×P-CAV	12×	48×(CAV), 32×(P-CAV)	24×, 6×, 8×	8×, 8×	12× P-CAV	None	LightScribe variant
SH-B123L	2010	Mechanical tray	48×, 40×, 40×, 40×	16×, 16×, 12×	12×, 12×, 12×	5×P-CAV	12×	48×, 24×	24×, 6×, 8×	8×, 8×	5× P-CAV	None	LightScribe variant

=== Slim type ===
On slim type optical drives, accessing speeds are physically limited by the rotation speeds of the engine rather than the performance of the optical pickup system or the physical strength of the disc.

Model	Type and interface	Release date	Loading mechanism	Reading speeds					Writing speeds					Additional functionality
Model	Type and interface	Release date	Loading mechanism	CD	DVD (single layer)	DVD (dual layer)	DVD-RAM	BluRay disc	CD (Note: CD-R: 24×CAV; CD-RW: 24×Z-CLV in zones of 10×CLV, 16×CLV, 20×CLV and 24×CLV of which the highest speed zone depends on the used media's speed rating)	DVD (single layer) (Note: DVD±R: 8×CAV; DVD+RW: 4×Z-CLV or 8×CAV; DVD-RW:6×Z-CLV in zones of 2×CLV, 4×CLV, and 6×CLV of which the highest speed zone depends on the used media's speed rating)	DVD (dual layer) (Z-CLV)	DVD-RAM	BD-R	Additional functionality
TS-L633	Internal (mini SATA)	2009	Manual tray	24×	8×	8×	5× P-CAV	None	24×	8×	6×	5× P-CAV	None	
TS-T633	Internal (mini SATA)	2009	Slot	24×	8×	8×	5× P-CAV	None	24×	8×	6×	5× P-CAV	None	
TS-LB23	Internal (mini SATA)	2011	Manual tray	24×	8×	8×	5× P-CAV	6×	24×	8×	6×	5× P-CAV	None	
SD-L902A	Internal (mini SATA)	2006	Manual tray	24×	8×	8×	5× P-CAV	None	24×	8×	6×	5× P-CAV	None	HD-DVD support
SN-208AB SN-208FB SU-208CB	Internal (mini SATA)	2012	Manual tray	24×	8×	8×	5× P-CAV	None	24×	8×	6×	5× P-CAV	None	
SU-228HB	Internal (mini SATA)	?	Manual tray	24×	8×	8×	5× P-CAV	None	24×	8×	6×	5× P-CAV	None	LightScribe support
SE-208	External (USB-B mini)	2012	Manual tray	24×	8×	8×	5× P-CAV	None	24×	8×	6×	5× P-CAV	None	AV mode (FAT32 simulation)
SE-208BW	External (USB-B mini)	2012	Manual tray	24×	8×	8×	5× P-CAV	None	24×	8×	6×	5× P-CAV	None	AV mode (FAT32 simulation), Optical SmartHub (wireless connectivity)
SE-B18AB	External (USB-B mini)	2014	Slot	24×	8×	8×	5× P-CAV	None	24×	8×	6×	5× P-CAV	None	AV mode (FAT32 simulation)
SE-506	External (USB-B mini)	2013	Manual tray	24×	8×	8×	5× P-CAV	6×	24×	8×	6×	5× P-CAV	6×	AV mode (FAT32 simulation)

== See also ==
- Hitachi-LG Data Storage
- Sony Optiarc
