= Optical pickup system =

Optical pickup system may refer to:

- Pickup (music technology) § Optical
- Optical disc drive § Optical pickup system
