= Optiarc =

American brand of data storage drives

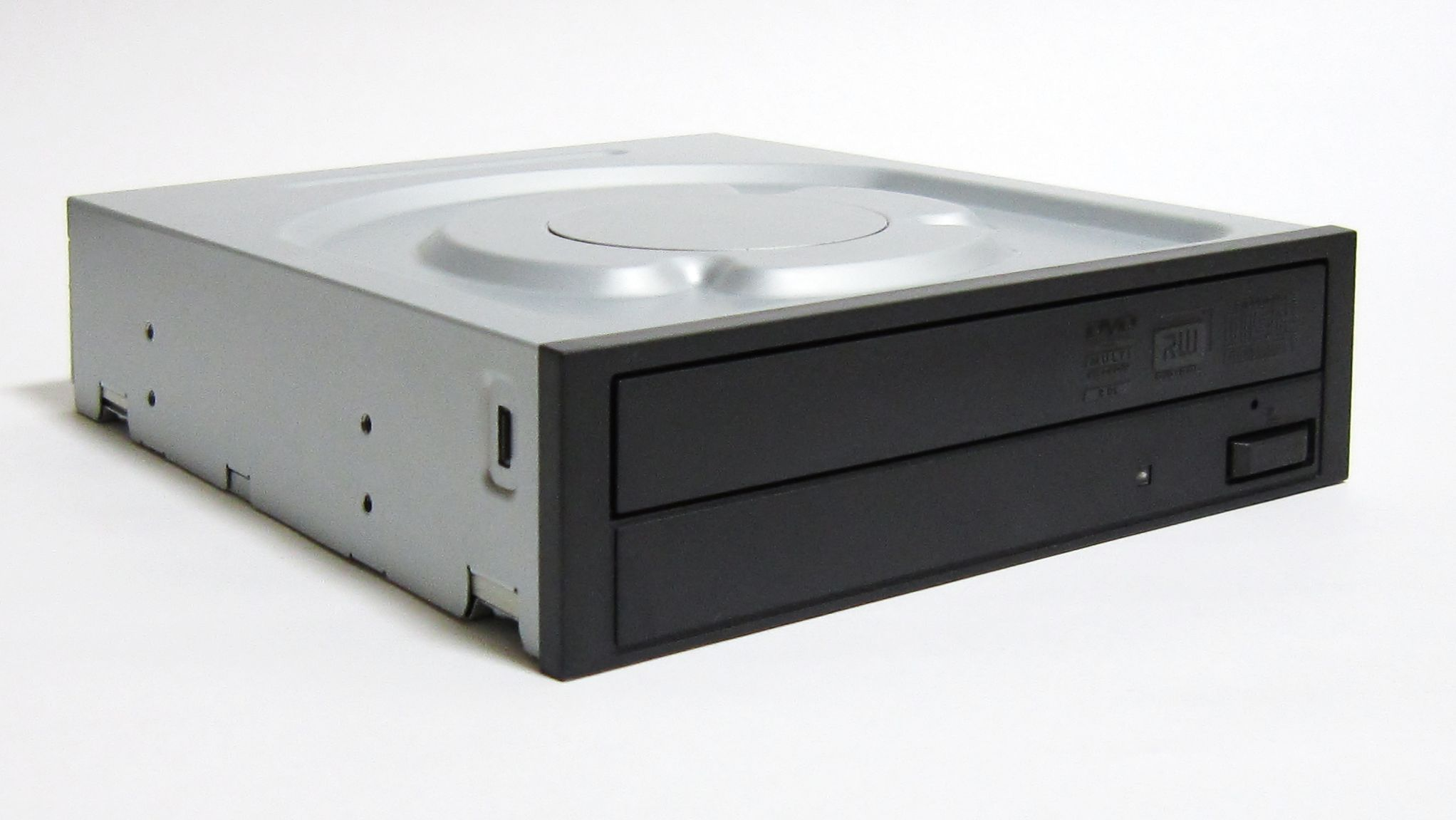
- Sony Optiarc DVD drive AD-7240S
- Product type: Optical disc drives; Solid-state drives
- Current owner: Vinpower
- Country: US (since 2017) Japan (2006-2013)
- Introduced: April 3, 2006; 20 years ago
- Discontinued: March 2013 (Sony Optiarc)
- Previous owners: Sony, NEC
- Website: www.optiarcinc.com

Optiarc is a brand of optical disc drives and solid-state drives. It is owned by a US-based Vinpower Digital, Inc.

Initially Optiarc was established on April 3, 2006 as a joint venture between Sony (55% shares) and NEC (45% shares). The company, named Sony NEC Optiarc, focused on manufacturing optical disk drives primarily for the OEM desktop and notebook PC markets.

On September 11, 2008, it was announced that Sony would take over NEC's 45% share, making Optiarc a wholly owned subsidiary of Sony, to be called Sony Optiarc. This took effect on December 5, 2008

In March 2013, Sony closed its Optiarc optical disc drive division, laying off about 400 employees globally.

In 2017, an American company, Vinpower Digital, whose main business is manufacturing optical disc and other media duplicators for the commercial market, acquired the rights to the Optiarc brand and product line. The brand PioData is also owned by Vinpower Digital.

== Products ==
Products were both DVD+/-R(W) and BD-ROM drives. Among other things, Sony Optiarc supplied the Blu-ray drives for the Sony PlayStation 3. The naming scheme for the drives is as follows: DDU stands for DVD-ROM, AD stands for DVD-RW, BR for BD-ROM and BC for BD Combo. A combo drive is a drive that only supports the newer format in reading and the predecessor in writing. The three digits that follow indicate the generation, the design (5.25" or slimline) and the speed class. The digit after that the equipment variant and the appended letter the interface. An AD-7243S is a 5.25" DVD-RW Drive with 24x speed when writing to DVD-R and DVD+R blanks. It also supports Labelflash. For Lightscribe, a "1" would be in the fourth position. The "S" indicates SATA. An “A” stands for PATA. However, all PATA Optiarc drives are now discontinued.

== See also ==
=== Similar joint ventures ===
- Hitachi-LG Data Storage
- Toshiba Samsung Storage Technology
