= Optical disc drive =

Type of computer disk storage drive

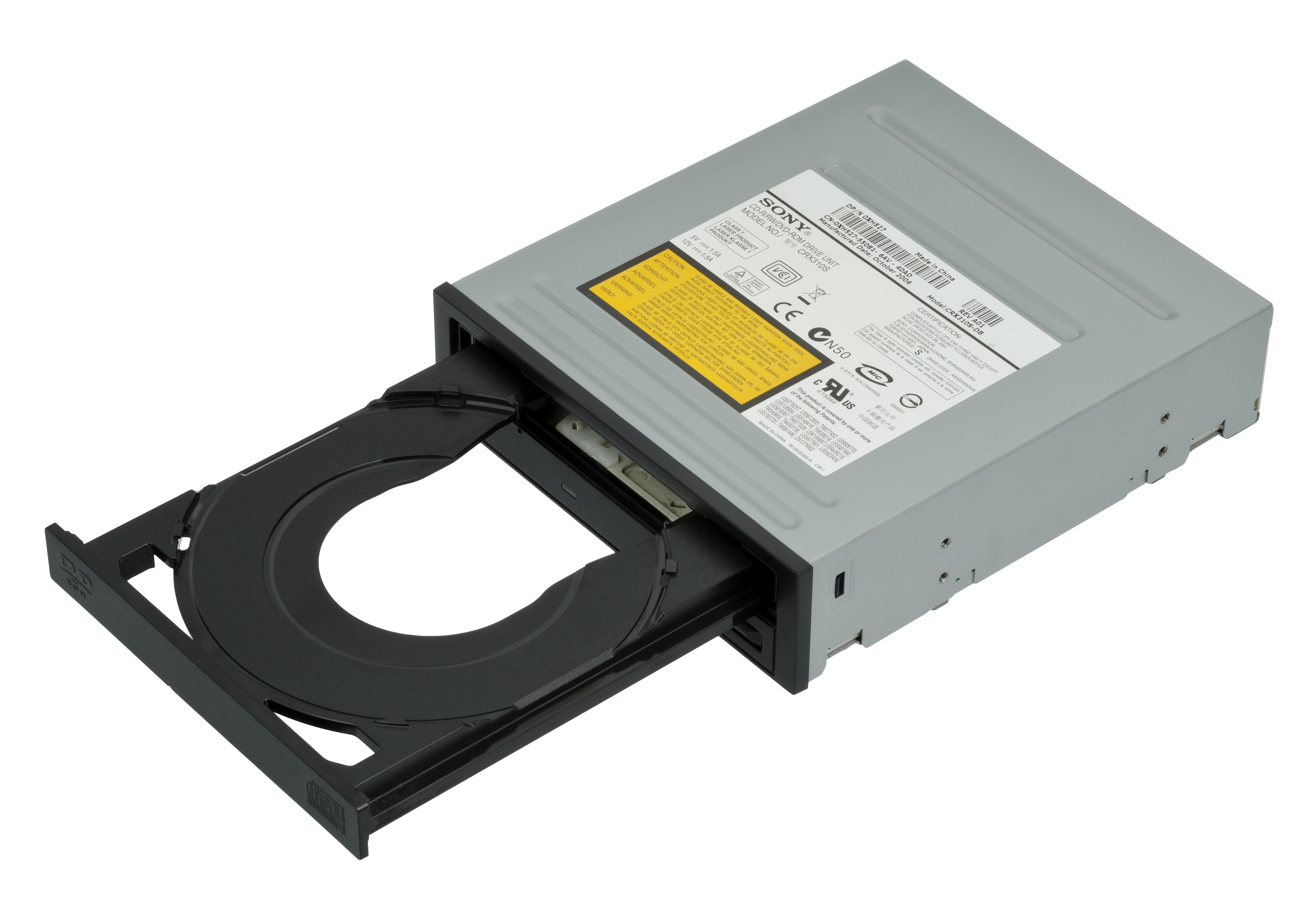
A CD-RW/DVD-ROM computer drive

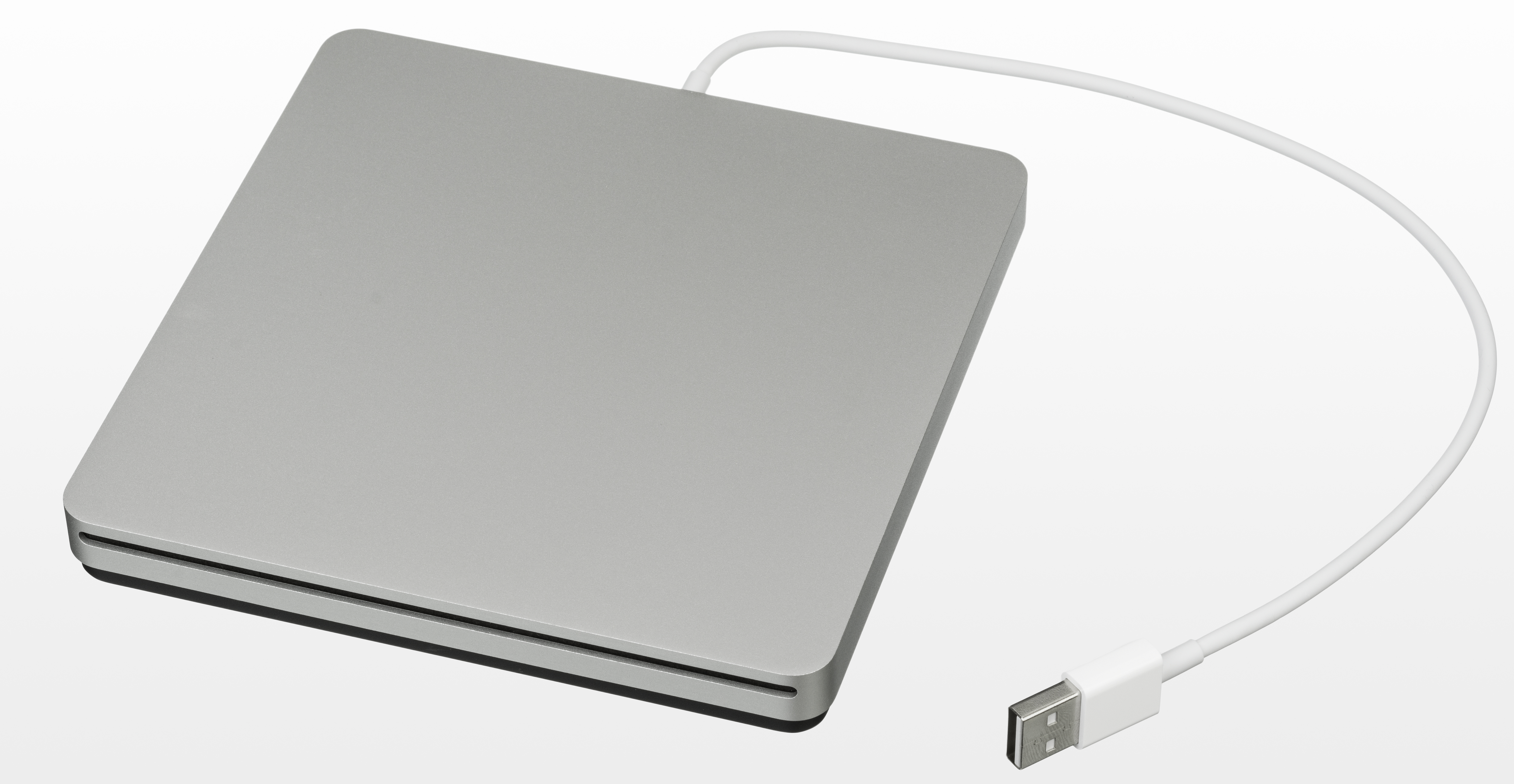
An external Apple USB SuperDrive

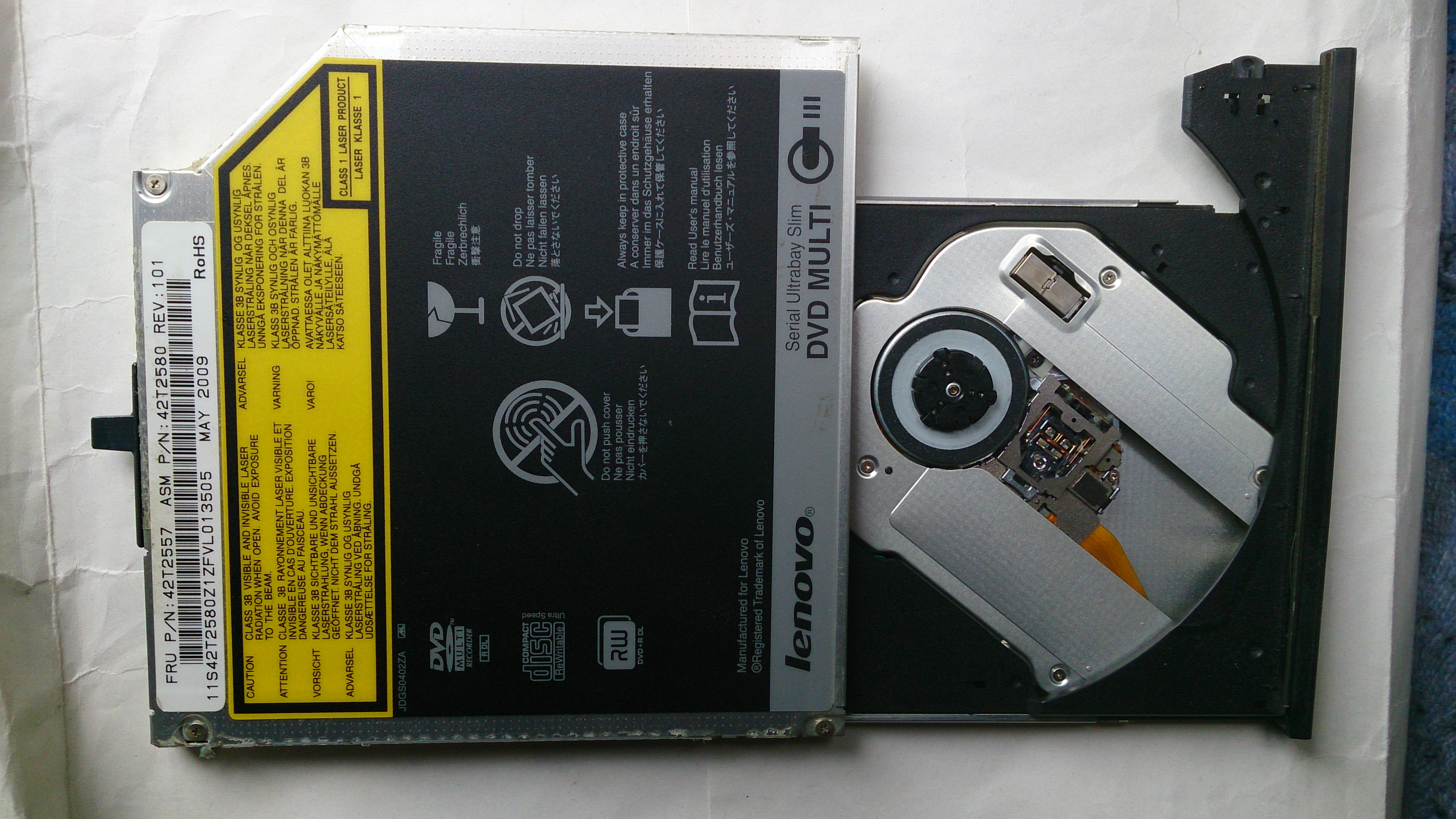
A removable internal Lenovo UltraBay slim type disc drive

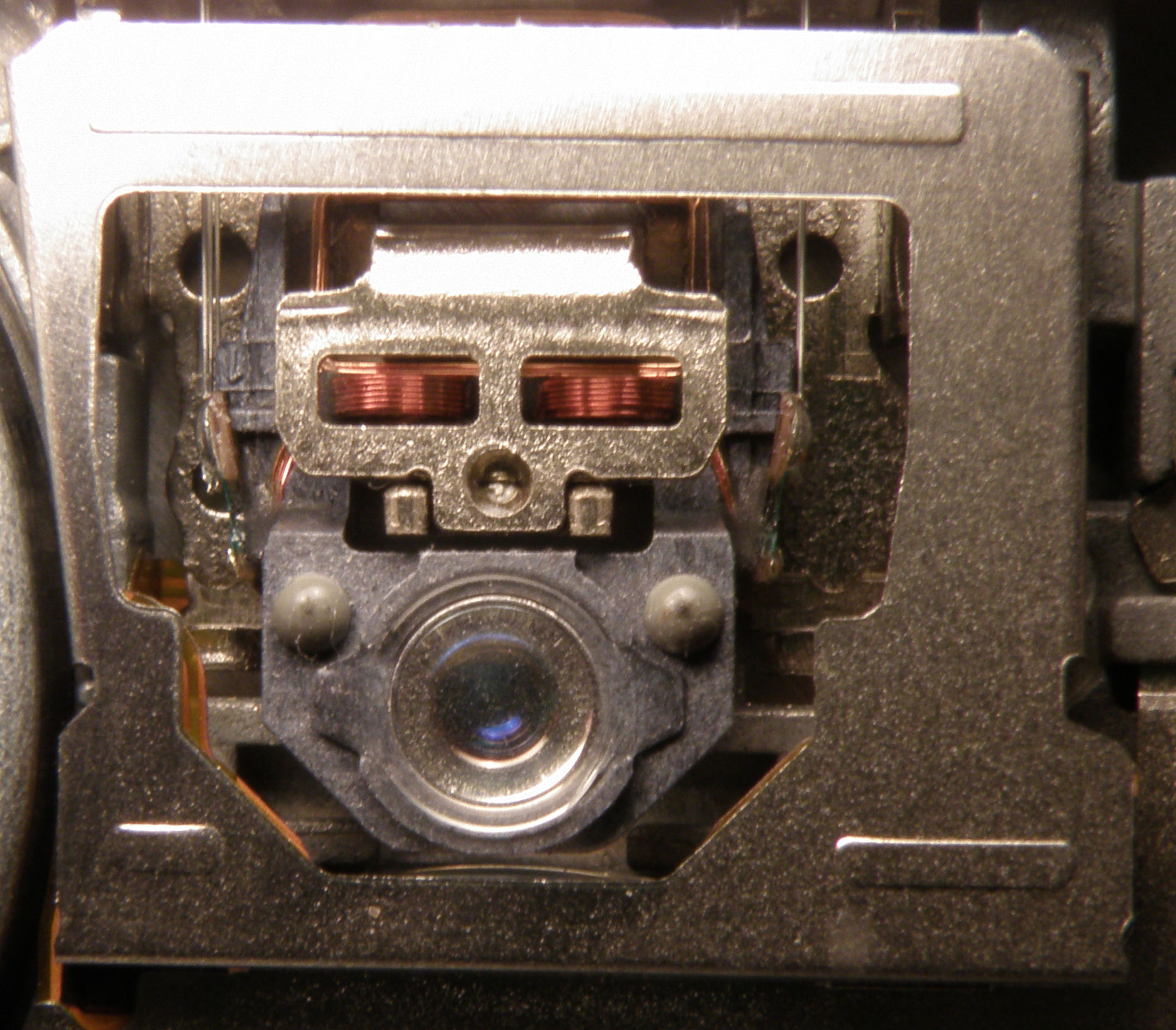
The CD/DVD drive lens on an Acer laptop

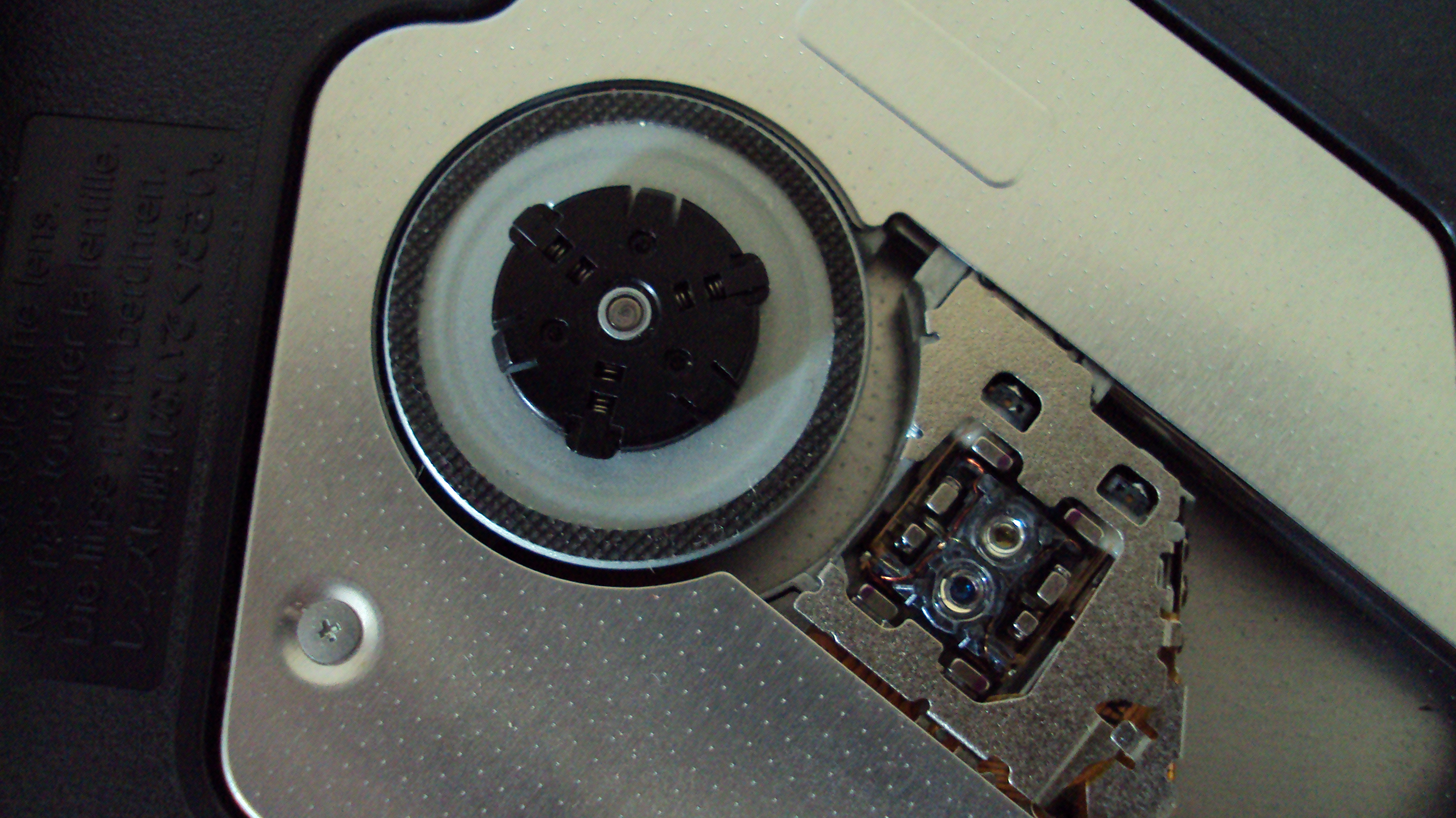
Lenses from a Blu-ray writer in a Sony Vaio E series laptop

In computing, an optical disc drive (ODD) is a disc drive that uses laser light or electromagnetic waves within or near the visible light spectrum as part of the process of reading or writing data to or from optical discs. Some drives can only read from certain discs, while other drives can both read and record. Those drives are called burners or writers since they physically burn the data onto the discs. Compact discs, DVDs, and Blu-ray discs are common types of optical media which can be read and recorded by such drives.

Although most laptop manufacturers no longer have optical drives bundled with their products, external drives are still available for purchase separately.

== Drive types ==
Some drives can only read data (CD,DVD,BD-ROM) whereas others can both read data and write data (CD,DVD-RW,BD-RE) to writable discs. Drives which can read but not write data are "-ROM" (read-only memory) drives, even if they can read from writable formats such as "-R" and "-RW". Some drives have mixed read and write capabilities, such as the TSST TS-LB23, which can only read Blu-ray discs but read and write CDs and DVDs.

As of 2021, most of the optical disc drives on the market are DVD and Blu-ray drives, which read from and record to those formats, along with having backward compatibility with audio CD, CD-R/-RW, and CD-ROM discs.

Compact disc-only drives (which cannot read/write DVDs) are no longer manufactured outside of audio devices and are obsolete in the consumer market for internal/external drives. Read-only DVD-ROM and BD-ROM drives are also manufactured, but are less commonly found in the consumer market, being mainly limited to media devices such as game consoles and disc media players. Most consumer-grade laptop computers used to come with built-in optical drives. Some laptop computers used modular systems (see Lenovo UltraBay). Throughout the 2010s, they ceased to come with built-in optical disc drives in order to reduce costs and make them lighter and thinner, requiring consumers to purchase external optical drives.

=== Appliances and functionality ===
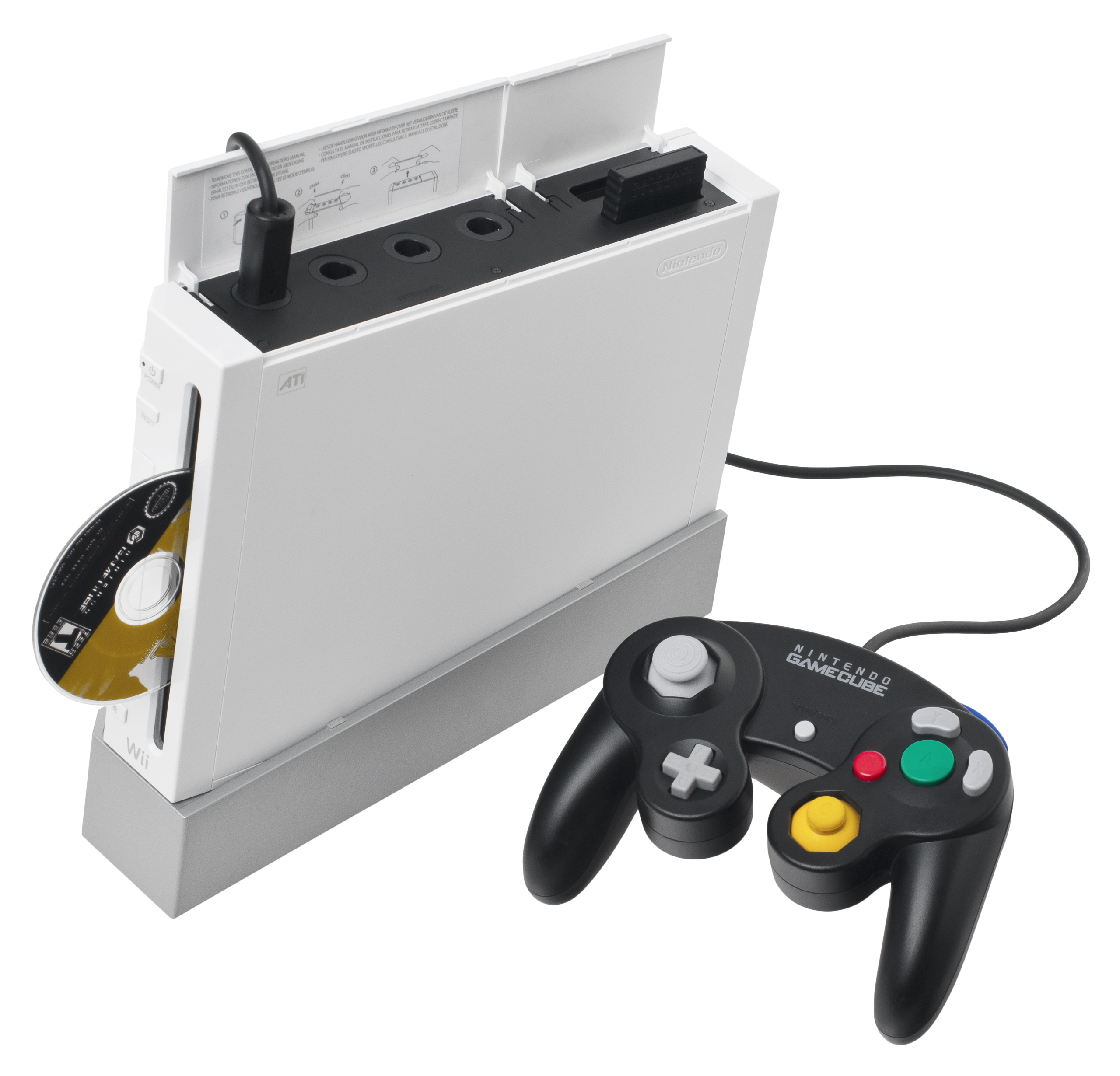
The 12 centimetre slot-loading optical drive of the Wii game console is compatible with 8 centimetre diameter discs to support GameCube discs (RVL-001 model only), the predecessor game console, allowing for backward compatibility.

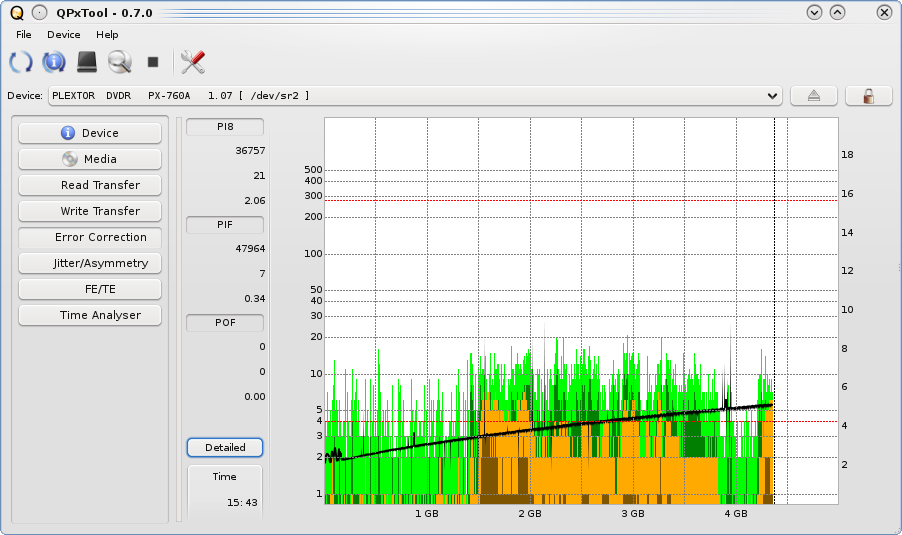
Some optical drives support measuring the error rate in the error correction code. An individual error does not cause data loss yet, but a higher rate means the error correction mechanism is more strained, which can predict a possible age-related future data loss. The depicted rate is well within a healthy range.

Optical disc drives are an integral part of standalone appliances such as CD players, DVD players, Blu-ray Disc players, DVD recorders, and video game consoles. As of 2017, the PlayStation and Xbox consoles are the only home video game consoles that are currently using optical discs as its primary storage format, as the Wii U's successor, the Nintendo Switch, began using game cartridges, while the PlayStation Portable is the only handheld console to use optical discs, using Sony's proprietary UMD format. They are also very commonly used in computers to read software and media distributed on disc and to record discs for archival and data exchange purposes. Floppy disk drives, with capacity of 1.44 MB, have been made obsolete: optical media are cheap and have vastly higher capacity to handle the large files used since the days of floppy disks, and the vast majority of computers and much consumer entertainment hardware have optical writers. USB flash drives, high-capacity, small, and inexpensive, are suitable where read/write capability is required.

Disc recording is restricted to storing files playable on consumer appliances (films, music, etc.), relatively small volumes of data (e.g. a standard DVD holds 4.7 gigabytes, however, higher-capacity formats such as multi-layer Blu-ray Discs exist) for local use, and data for distribution, but only on a small scale; mass-producing large numbers of identical discs by pressing (replication) is cheaper and faster than individual recording (duplication).

To support 8 centimetre diameter discs, drives with mechanical tray loading (desktop computer drives) have an indentation in the tray. It can however only be used in horizontal operation. Slot loading drives, frequently used in game consoles and car radios, might be able to accept 8 centimetre discs and center the disc automatically.

Optical discs are used to back up relatively small volumes of data, but backing up of entire hard drives, which as of 2025 typically contain many hundreds of gigabytes or even multiple terabytes, is less practical. Large backups are often instead made on external hard drives, as their price has dropped to a level making this viable; in professional environments magnetic tape drives are also used.

Some optical drives also allow predictively scanning the surface of discs for errors and detecting poor recording quality.

The drive reduces the rotation speed of discs when encountering damage, since a lower reading speed improves readability of damaged media.

With an option in the optical disc authoring software, optical disc writers are able to simulate the writing process on CD-R, CD-RW, DVD-R and DVD-RW, which allows for testing such as observing the writing speeds and patterns (e.g. constant angular velocity, constant linear velocity and P-CAV and Z-CLV variants) with different writing speed settings and testing the highest capacity of an individual disc that would be achievable using overburning, without writing any data to the disc.

Few optical drives allow simulating a FAT32 flash drive from optical discs containing ISO9660/Joliet and UDF file systems or audio tracks (simulated as .wav files), for compatibility with most USB multimedia appliances.

== Key components ==
=== Form factors ===
Optical drives for computers come either in half-height form factor, designed to fit a standard desktop 5.25-inch drive bay, or as a slim type (used in laptop computers and compact desktop computers) with a height of 12.7 mm or thinner in "ultra slim" and "internal slim" variations. They are also used in external variants.

Optical drive form factors and dimensions
Form factor	Width	Height	Depth	SATA power connector (Note: For drives using SATA. Some optical drives use other interfaces, see § Computer interfaces)	Source
half-height	5 3/4 inches (146.1 mm)	1 5/8 inches (41.3 mm)	8 inches (203.2 mm) max.	standard	
slim	128 mm	12.7 mm	127 mm	slimline	
ultra slim	128 mm	9.5 mm	127 mm	slimline	
internal slim	128 mm	7.5 mm	127 mm	slimline	

Half-height optical drives operate upwards of twice the speeds as slim type optical drives, because speeds on slim type optical drives are constrained to the physical limitations of the drive motor's rotation speed (around 5000rpm) rather than the performance of the optical pickup system.

Because half-height demand much more electrical power and a voltage of 12 V DC, while slim optical drives run on 5 volts, external half height optical drives require separate external power input, while external slim type are usually able to operate entirely on power delivered through a computer's USB port. (In some slim drives, two USB connectors are required, each supplying power, but only one the data.) Half height drives are also faster than Slim drives due to this, since more power is required to spin the disc at higher speeds.

Half-height optical drives hold discs in place from both sides while slim type optical drives fasten the disc from the bottom.

Half height drives fasten the disc using 2 spindles containing a magnet each, one under and one above the disc tray. The spindles may be lined with flocking or a texturized silicone material to exert friction on the disc, to keep it from slipping. The upper spindle is left slightly loose and is attracted to the lower spindle because of the magnets they have. When the tray is opened, a mechanism driven by the movement of the tray pulls the lower spindle away from the upper spindle and vice versa when the tray is closed. When the tray is closed, the lower spindle touches the inner circumference of the disc, and slightly raises the disc from the tray to the upper spindle, which is attracted to the magnet on the lower disc, clamping the disc in place. Only the lower spindle is motorized. Trays in half height drives often fully open and close using a motorized mechanism that can be pushed to close, controlled by the computer, or controlled using a button on the drive. Trays on half height and slim drives can also be locked by whatever program is using it, however it can still be ejected by inserting the end of a paper clip into an emergency eject hole on the front of the drive. Early CD players such as the Sony CDP-101 used a separate motorized mechanism to clamp the disc to the motorized spindle.

Slim drives use a special spindle with spring loaded specially shaped studs that radiate outwards, pressing against the inner edge of the disc. The user has to put uniform pressure onto the inner circumference of the disc to clamp it to the spindle and pull from the outer circumference while placing the thumb on the spindle to remove the disc, flexing it slightly in the process and returning to its normal shape after removal. The outer rim of the spindle may have a texturized silicone surface to exert friction keeping the disc from slipping. In slim drives most if not all components are on the disc tray, which pops out using a spring mechanism that can be controlled by the computer. These trays cannot close on their own; they have to be pushed until the tray reaches a stop.

The top surface of the metal chassis of half-height (desktop) drives can be shaped in a way that reduces disc rotation noise and creates an airflow that stabilizes the disc. For this reason the top surface of many drives have indents instead of being completely flat. Slim-type (laptop-height) drives lack them due to a lack of physical room and don't need them given that they spin discs at much lower speeds.

=== Laser and optics ===
==== Optical pickup system ====
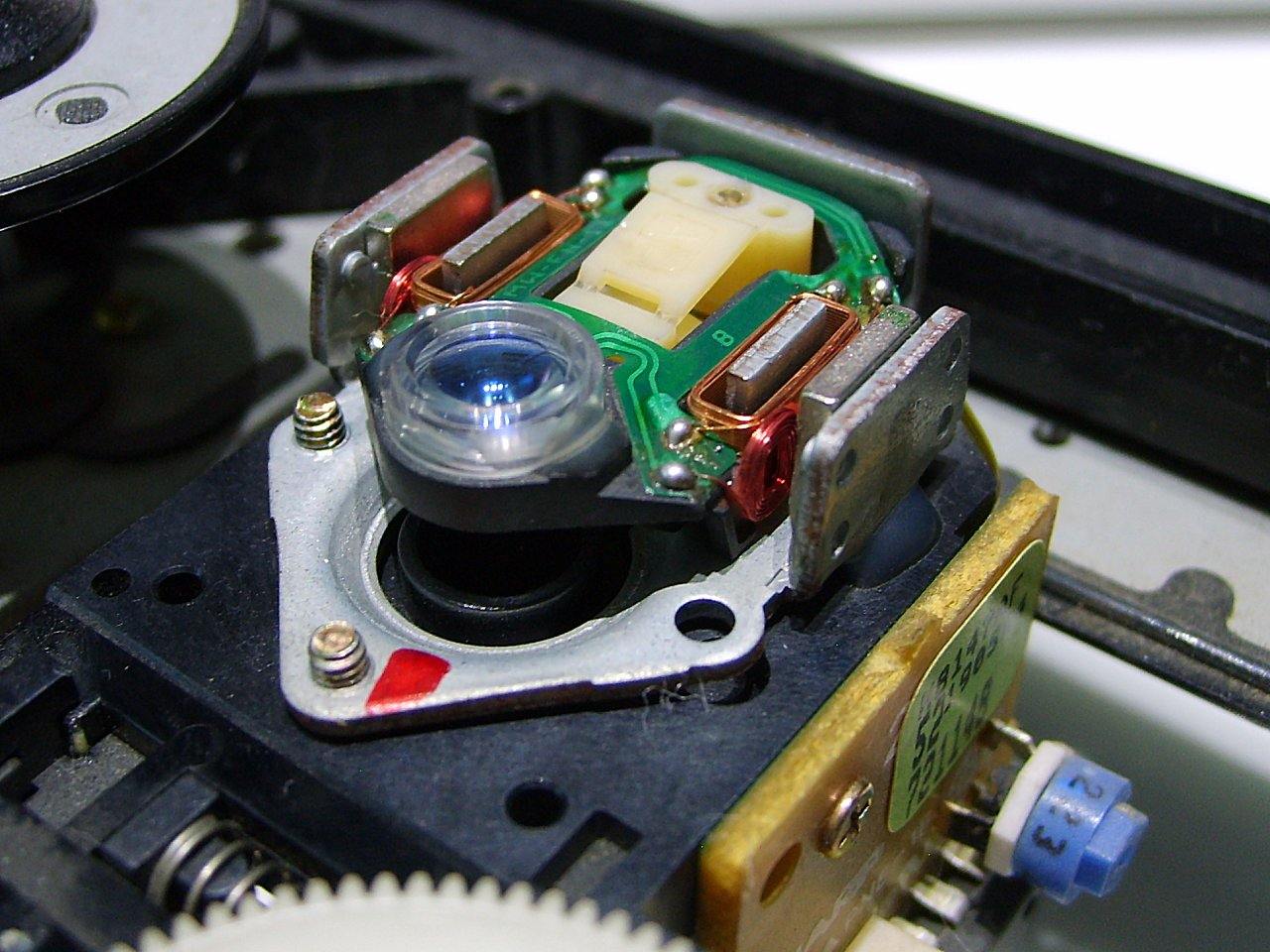
Pickup head

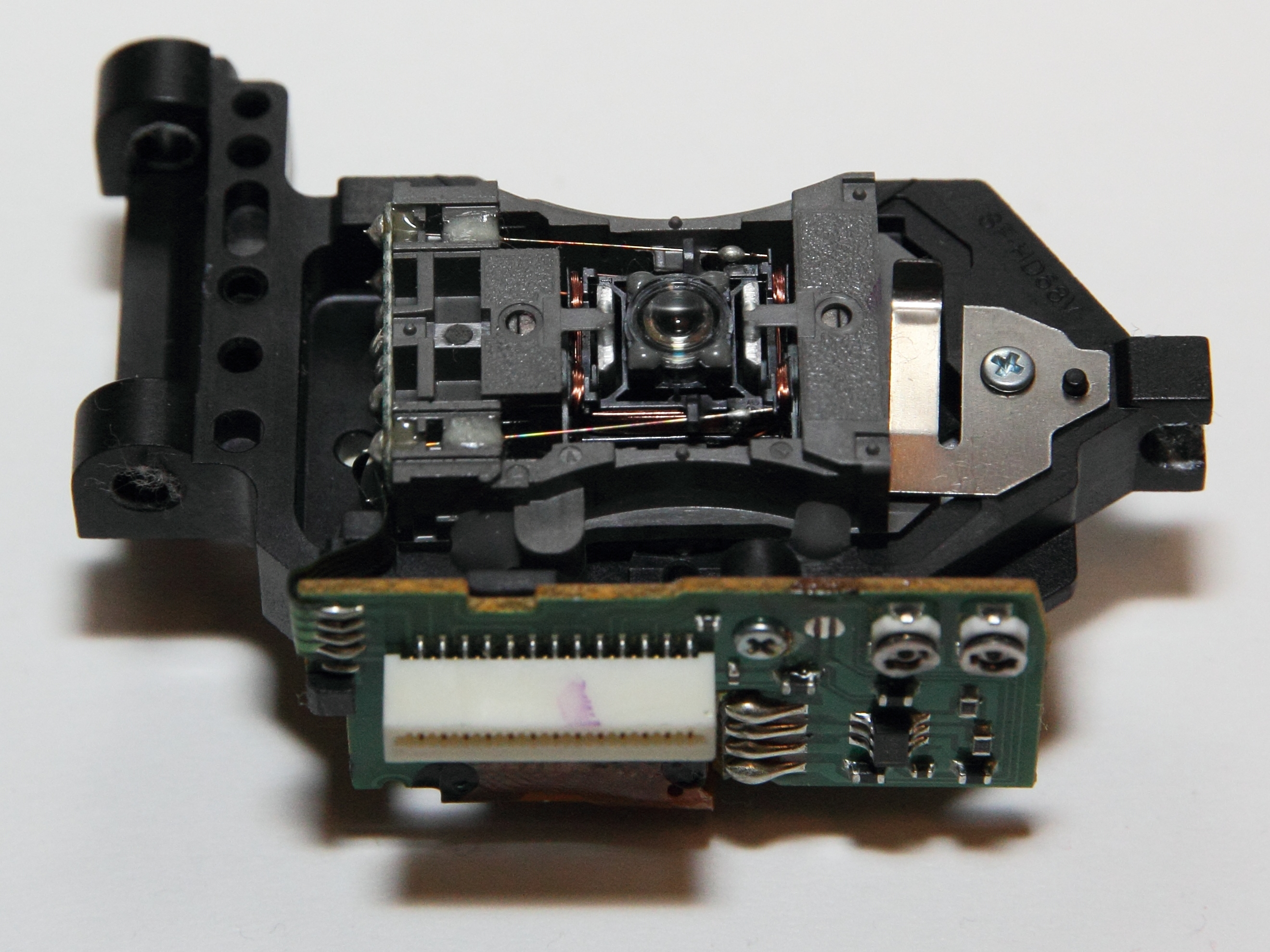
Optical pickup unit with two visible potentiometers

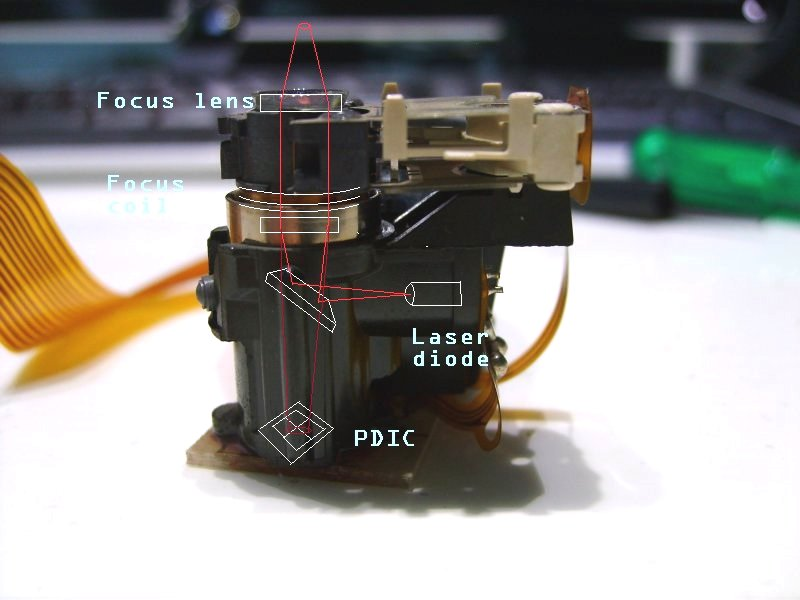
Pickup head, side view

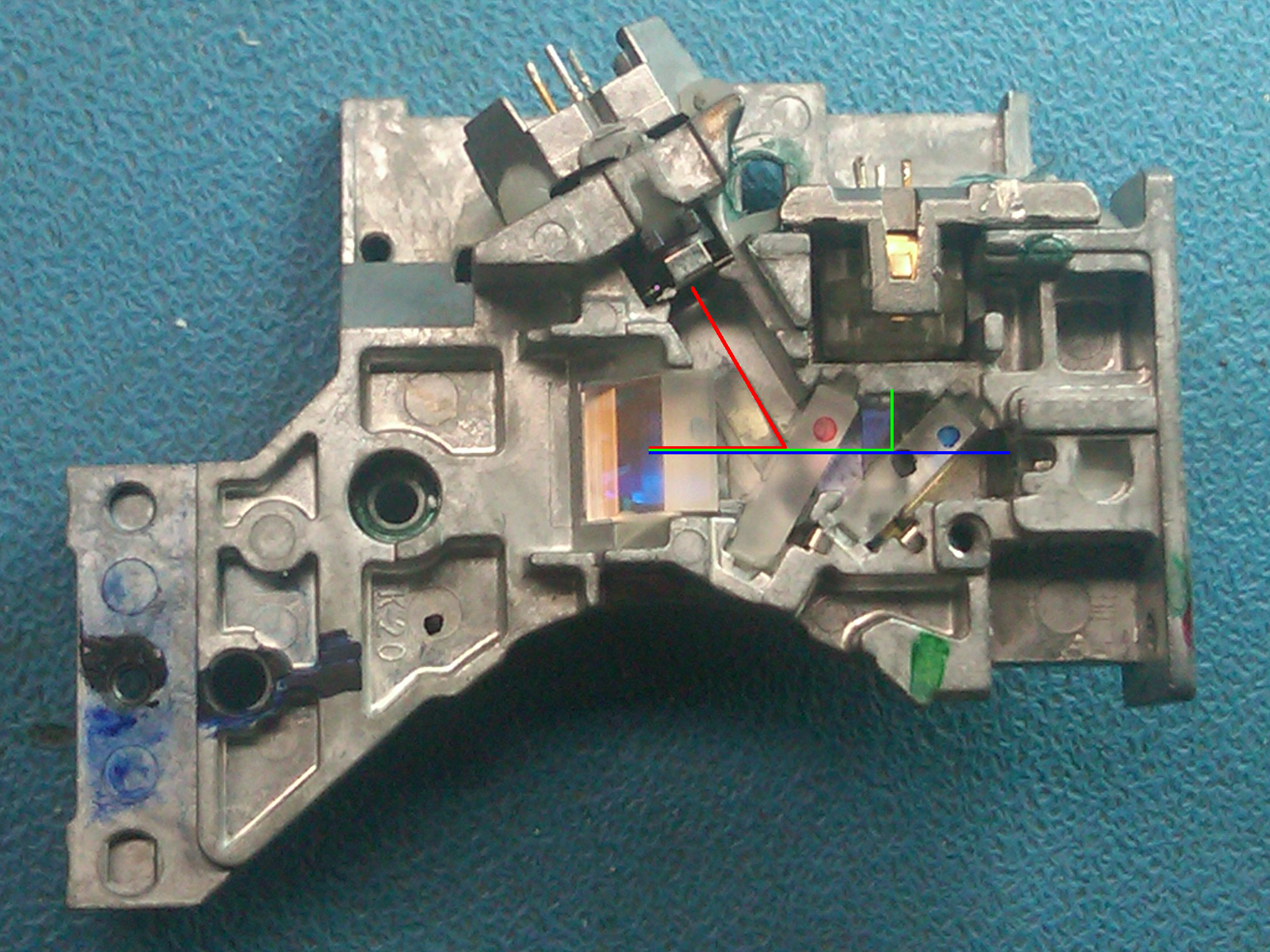
Optical path

The most important part of an optical disc drive is an optical path, which is inside a pickup head (PUH). The PUH is also known as a laser pickup, optical pickup, pickup, pickup assembly, laser assembly, laser optical assembly, optical pickup head/unit or optical assembly. It usually consists of a semiconductor laser diode, a lens for focusing the laser beam, and photodiodes for detecting the light reflected from the disc's surface.

Initially, CD-type lasers with a wavelength of 780 nm (infrared) were used. For DVDs, the wavelength was reduced to 650 nm (red), and for Blu-ray Disc this was reduced even further to 405 nm (violet).

Two main servomechanisms are used, the first to maintain the proper distance between lens and disc, to ensure the laser beam is focused as a small laser spot on the disc. The second servo moves the pickup head along the disc's radius, keeping the beam on the track, a continuous spiral data path. Optical disc media are 'read' beginning at the inner radius to the outer edge.

Near the laser lens, optical drives are usually equipped with one to three tiny potentiometers (usually separate ones for CDs, DVDs, and usually a third one for Blu-ray Discs if supported by the drive) that can be turned using a fine screwdriver. The potentiometer is in a series circuit with the laser lens.

The laser diode used in DVD writers can have powers of up to 100 milliwatts, such high powers are used during writing. Some CD players have automatic gain control (AGC) to vary the power of the laser to ensure reliable playback of CD-RW discs.

Readability (the ability to read physically damaged or soiled discs) may vary among optical drives due to differences in optical pickup systems, firmwares, and damage patterns.

==== Read-only media ====
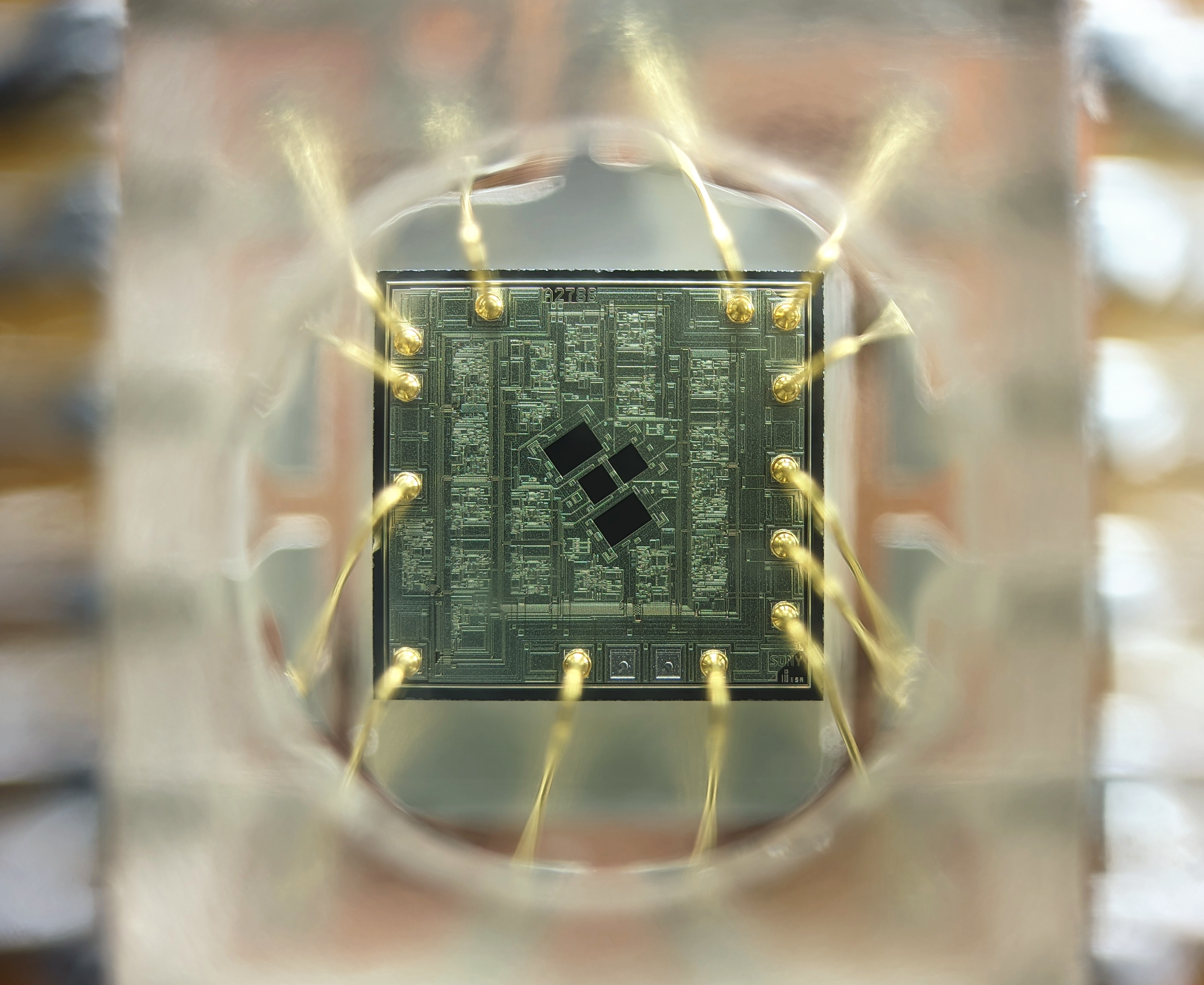
The optical sensor out of a CD/DVD drive. The two larger rectangles are the photodiodes for pits, the inner one for land. This one also includes amplification and minor processing.

On factory-pressed read only media (ROM), during the manufacturing process the tracks are formed by pressing a thermoplastic resin into a nickel stamper that was made by plating a glass 'master' with raised 'bumps' on a flat surface, thus creating pits and lands in the plastic disk. Because the depth of the pits is approximately one-quarter to one-sixth of the laser's wavelength, the reflected beam's phase is shifted in relation to the incoming beam, causing mutual destructive interference and reducing the reflected beam's intensity. This is detected by photodiodes that create corresponding electrical signals.

==== Recordable media ====
An optical disk recorder encodes (also known as burning, since the dye layer is permanently burned) data onto a recordable CD-R, DVD-R, DVD+R, or BD-R disc (called a blank) by selectively heating (burning) parts of an organic dye layer with a laser.

This changes the reflectivity of the dye, thereby creating marks that can be read like the pits and lands on pressed discs. For recordable discs, the process is permanent and the media can be written to only once. While the reading laser is usually not stronger than 5 mW, the writing laser is considerably more powerful. DVD lasers operate at voltages of around 2.5 volts.

The higher the writing speed, the less time a laser has to heat a point on the media, thus its power has to increase proportionally. DVD burners' lasers often peak at about 200 mW, either in continuous wave and pulses, although some have been driven up to 400 mW before the diode fails.

==== Rewriteable media ====
For rewritable CD-RW, DVD-RW, DVD+RW, DVD-RAM, or BD-RE media, the laser is used to melt a crystalline metal alloy in the recording layer of the disc. Depending on the amount of power applied, the substance may be allowed to melt back (change the phase back) into crystalline form or left in an amorphous form, enabling marks of varying reflectivity to be created.

==== Double-sided media ====
Double-sided media may be used, but they are not easily accessed with a standard drive, as they must be physically turned over to access the data on the other side.

==== Dual layer media ====
Double layer or dual layer (DL) media have two independent data layers separated by a semi-reflective layer. Both layers are accessible from the same side, but require the optics to change the laser's focus. Traditional single layer (SL) writable media are produced with a spiral groove molded in the protective polycarbonate layer (not in the data recording layer), to lead and synchronize the speed of recording head. Double-layered writable media have: a first polycarbonate layer with a (shallow) groove, a first data layer, a semi-reflective layer, a second (spacer) polycarbonate layer with another (deep) groove, and a second data layer. The first groove spiral usually starts on the inner edge and extends outwards, while the second groove start on the outer edge and extends inwards.

==== Photothermal printing ====
Some drives support Hewlett-Packard's LightScribe, or the alternative LabelFlash photothermal printing technology for labeling specially coated discs.

==== Multi beam drives ====
Zen Technology and Sony have developed drives that use several laser beams simultaneously to read discs and write to them at higher speeds than what would be possible with a single laser beam. The limitation with a single laser beam comes from wobbling of the disc that may occur at high rotational speeds; at 25,000 RPMs CDs become unreadable while Blu-rays cannot be written to beyond 5,000 RPMs. With a single laser beam, the only way to increase read and write speeds without reducing the pit length of the disc (which would allow for more pits and thus bits of data per revolution, but may require smaller wavelength light) is by increasing the rotational speed of the disc which reads more pits in less time, increasing data rate; hence why faster drives spin the disc at higher speeds. In addition, CDs at 27,500 RPMs (such as to read the inside of a CD at 52x) may explode causing extensive damage to the disc's surroundings, and poor quality or damaged discs may explode at lower speeds.

In Zen's system (developed in conjunction with Sanyo and licensed by Kenwood), a diffraction grating is used to split a laser beam into 7 beams, which are then focused into the disc; a central beam is used for focusing and tracking the groove of the disc leaving 6 remaining beams (3 on either side) that are spaced evenly to read 6 separate portions of the groove of the disc in parallel, effectively increasing read speeds at lower RPMs, reducing drive noise and stress on the disc. The beams then reflect back from the disc, and are collimated and projected into a special photodiode array to be read. The first drives using the technology could read at 40x, later increasing to 52x and finally 72x. It uses a single optical pickup.

In Sony's system (used on their proprietary Optical Disc Archive system which is based on Archival Disc, itself based on Blu-ray) the drive has 4 optical pickups, two on each side of the disc, with each pickup having two lenses for a total of 8 lenses and laser beams. This allows for both sides of the disc to be read and written to at the same time, and for the contents of the disc to be verified during writing.

=== Rotational mechanism ===
Comparison of several forms of disk storage showing tracks (not-to-scale); green denotes start and red denotes end.
* Some CD-R(W) and DVD-R(W)/DVD+R(W) recorders operate in ZCLV, CAA or CAV modes.

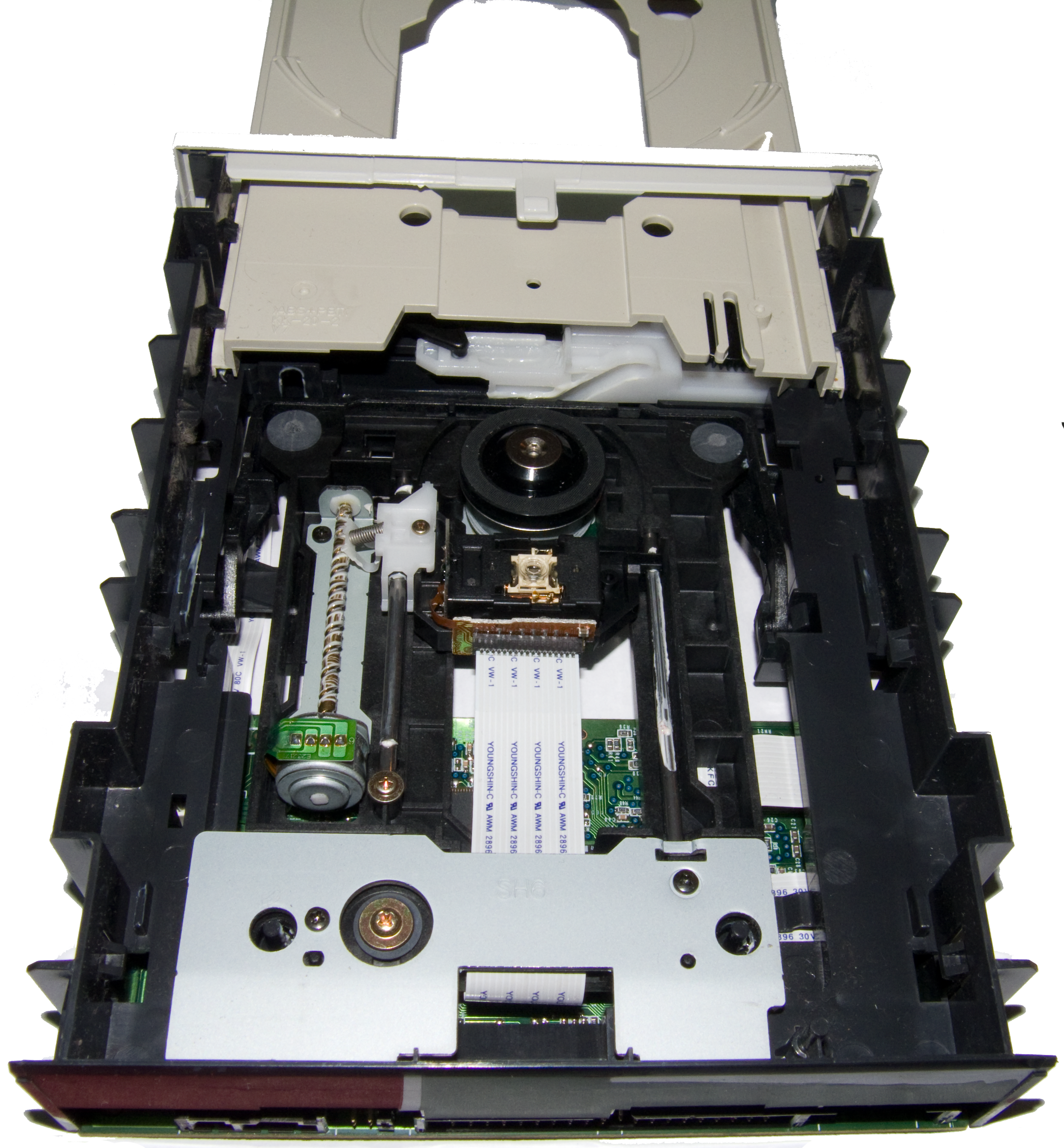
A half-height CD-ROM drive (without case)

The rotational mechanism in an optical drive differs considerably from that of a hard disk drive's, in that the latter keeps a constant angular velocity (CAV), in other words a constant number of revolutions per minute (RPM). With CAV, a higher throughput is generally achievable at the outer disc compared to the inner.

On the other hand, optical drives were developed with an assumption of achieving a constant throughput, in CD drives initially equal to 150 KiB/s. It was a feature important for streaming audio data that always tend to require a constant bit rate. But to ensure no disc capacity was wasted, a head had to transfer data at a maximum linear rate at all times too, without slowing on the outer rim of the disc. This led to optical drives—until recently—operating with a constant linear velocity (CLV). The spiral groove of the disc passed under its head at a constant speed. The implication of CLV, as opposed to CAV, is that disc angular velocity is no longer constant, and the spindle motor needed to be designed to vary its speed from between 200 RPM on the outer rim and 500 RPM on the inner, keeping the data rate constant.

Later CD drives kept the CLV paradigm, but evolved to achieve higher rotational speeds, popularly described in multiples of a base speed. As a result, a 4× CLV drive, for instance, would rotate at 800-2000 RPM, while transferring data steadily at 600 KiB/s, which is equal to 4 × 150 KiB/s.

For DVDs, base or 1× speed is 1.385 MB/s, equal to 1.32 MiB/s, approximately nine times faster than the CD base speed. For Blu-ray drives, base speed is 6.74 MB/s, equal to 6.43 MiB/s.

Because keeping a constant transfer rate for the whole disc is not so important in most contemporary CD uses, a pure CLV approach had to be abandoned to keep the rotational speed of the disc safely low while maximizing data rate. Some drives work in a partial CLV (PCLV) scheme, by switching from CLV to CAV only when a rotational limit is reached. But switching to CAV requires considerable changes in hardware design, so instead most drives use the zoned constant linear velocity (Z-CLV) scheme. This divides the disc into several zones, each having its own constant linear velocity. A Z-CLV recorder rated at "52×", for example, would write at 20× on the innermost zone and then progressively increase the speed in several discrete steps up to 52× at the outer rim. Without higher rotational speeds, increased read performance may be attainable by simultaneously reading more than one point of a data groove, also known as multi-beam, but drives with such mechanisms are more expensive, less compatible, and very uncommon.

==== Limit ====
In the past, CD-ROMs have exploded when damaged or spun at excessive speeds. This imposes a constraint on the maximum safe speeds (56× CAV for CDs or around 18×CAV in the case of DVDs) at which drives can operate. Lite-On estimates the incidence of exploding CDs at one or two discs in 10,000.

The reading speeds of most half-height optical disc drives released since c. 2007 are limited to ×48 for CDs, ×16 for DVDs and ×12 (angular velocities) for Blu-ray Discs, which are physically similar rotation speeds that surround 10,000 rpm despite of the differing numbers. (Note: The angular disc speeds of ×48 on CDs, ×16 on DVDs and ×12 on Blu-ray Discs refer to that equivalent linear velocity required for this multiple of the respective original speeds, if accessed at the outermost disc edge, and amounts to similar physical rotation speeds.) Writing speeds on selected write-once media are higher.

Some optical drives additionally throttle the reading speed based on the contents of optical discs, such as max. 40× CAV (constant angular velocity) for the Digital Audio Extraction (“DAE”) of Audio CD tracks, 16× CAV for Video CD contents and even lower limitations on earlier models such as 4× CLV (constant linear velocity) for Video CDs.

A 2003 MythBusters episode erroneously claims that a CD spinning at "52× speed" spins at 30,000 rotations per minute (rpm). This miscalculation is caused by assuming a linear velocity of 52× at the inner edge of the data area of the disc, which would indeed reach dangerous speeds in excess of 25,000 rpm, therefore optical drives never spin discs at such speeds. In actuality, a CD speed of "52×" are approximately 10,000 rpm (see table, different for DVD and Blu-ray), given that drives are advertised with their angular velocities. The angular velocity is the measured as the linear velocity at the outermost edge of the disc, where the linear velocity (and accordingly the data transfer rate) is roughly 2.5 times higher than at the innermost edge of the data area.

=== Loading mechanisms ===
==== Tray and slot loading ====
Current optical drives use either a tray-loading mechanism, where the disc is loaded onto a motorized tray (as utilized by half-height, "desktop" drives), a manually operated tray (as utilized in laptop computers, also called slim type), or a slot-loading mechanism, where the disc is slid into a slot and drawn in by motorized rollers. Slot-loading optical drives exist in both half-height (desktop) and slim type (laptop) form factors.

With both types of mechanisms, if a CD or DVD is left in the drive after the computer is turned off, the disc cannot be ejected using the normal eject mechanism of the drive. However, tray-loading drives account for this situation by providing a small hole where one can insert a paperclip to manually open the drive tray to retrieve the disc.

Slot-loading optical disc drives are prominently used in game consoles and vehicle audio units. Although allowing more convenient insertion, those have the disadvantages that they cannot usually accept the smaller 80 mm diameter discs (unless 80 mm optical disc adapter is used) or any non-standard sizes, usually have no emergency eject hole or eject button, and therefore have to be disassembled if the optical disc cannot be ejected normally. However, some slot-loading optical drives have been engineered to support miniature discs. The Wii, because of backward compatibility with GameCube games, and PlayStation 3 video game consoles are able to load both standard size DVDs and 80 mm discs in the same slot-loading drive. Its successor's slot drive however, the Wii U, lacks miniature disc compatibility.

There were also some early CD-ROM drives for desktop PCs in which its tray-loading mechanism will eject slightly and user has to pull out the tray manually to load a CD, similar to the tray ejecting method used in internal optical disc drives of modern laptops and modern external slim portable optical disc drives. Like the top-loading mechanism, they have spring-loaded ball bearings on the spindle.

==== Top-load ====
A small number of drive models, mostly compact portable units, have a top-loading mechanism where the drive lid is manually opened upwards and the disc is placed directly onto the spindle (for example, all PlayStation One consoles, PlayStation 2 Slim, PlayStation 3 Super Slim, GameCube consoles, Wii Mini, Dreamcast, most portable CD players, and some standalone CD recorders feature top-loading drives). These sometimes have the advantage of using spring-loaded ball bearings to hold the disc in place, minimizing damage to the disc if the drive is moved while it is spun up.

Unlike tray and slot loading mechanisms by default, top-load optical drives can be opened without being connected to power.

==== Cartridge load ====
Some early CD-ROM drives used a mechanism where CDs had to be inserted into special cartridges or caddies, somewhat similar in appearance to a 3.5 inch micro floppy diskette. This was intended to protect the disc from accidental damage by enclosing it in a tougher plastic casing, but did not gain wide acceptance due to the additional cost and compatibility concerns—such drives would also inconveniently require "bare" discs to be manually inserted into an openable caddy before use. Ultra Density Optical (UDO), Magneto-optical drives, Universal Media Disc (UMD), DataPlay, Professional Disc, MiniDisc, Optical Disc Archive as well as early DVD-RAM and Blu-ray discs use optical disc cartridges.

=== Computer interfaces ===
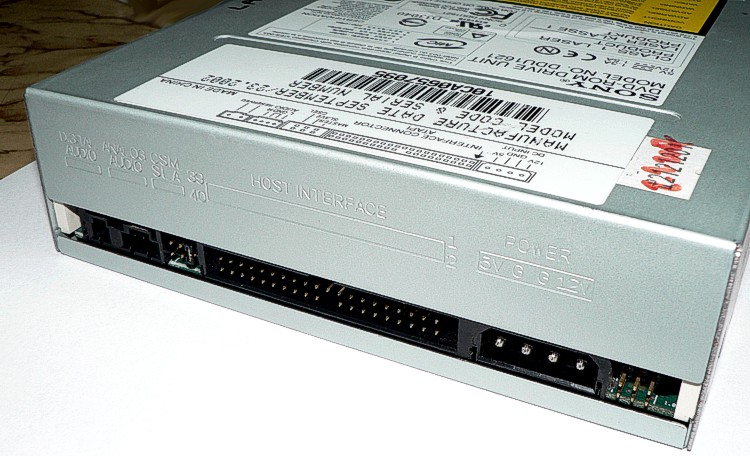
Digital audio output, analog audio output, and parallel ATA interface

All optical disc-drives use the SCSI-protocol on a command bus level, and initial systems used either a fully featured SCSI bus or as these were somewhat cost-prohibitive to sell to consumer applications, a proprietary cost-reduced version of the bus. This is because conventional ATA-standards at the time did not support, or have any provisions for any sort of removable media or hot-plugging of disk drives. Most modern internal drives for personal computers, servers, and workstations are designed to fit in a standard 5 1/4-inch (also written as 5.25 inch) drive bay and connect to their host via an ATA or SATA bus interface, but communicate using the SCSI protocol commands on software level as per the ATA Package Interface standard developed for making Parallel ATA/IDE interfaces compatible with removable media. Some devices may support vendor-specific commands such as recording density ("GigaRec"), laser power setting ("VariRec"), ability to manually hard-limit rotation speed in a way that overrides the universal speed setting (separately for reading and writing), and adjusting the lens and tray movement speeds where a lower setting reduces noise, as implmenented on some Plextor drives, as well as the ability to force overspeed burning, meaning beyond speed recommended for the media type, for testing purposes, as implemented on some Lite-On drives. Additionally, there may be digital and analog outputs for audio. The outputs may be connected via a header cable to the sound card or the motherboard or to headphones or an external speaker with a 3.5mm AUX plug cable that many early optical drives are equipped with. At one time, computer software resembling CD players controlled playback of the CD. Today the information is extracted from the disc as digital data, to be played back or converted to other file formats.

Some early optical drives have dedicated buttons for CD playback controls on their front panel, allowing them to act as a standalone compact disc player.

External drives were popular in the beginning, because the drives often required complex electronics to institute, rivaling in complexity the Host computer system itself. External drives using SCSI, Parallel port, USB and FireWire interfaces exist, most modern drives being USB. Some portable versions for laptops power themselves from batteries or directly from their interface bus.

Drives with a SCSI interface were originally the only system interface available, but they never became popular in the price sensitive low-end consumer market which constituted majority of the demand. They were less common and tended to be more expensive, because of the cost of their interface chipsets, more complex SCSI connectors, and small volume of sales in comparison to proprietary cost-reduced applications, but most importantly because most consumer market computer systems did not have any sort of SCSI interface in them the market for them was small. However, support for multitude of various cost-reduced proprietary optical drive bus standards were usually embedded with sound cards which were often bundled with the optical drives themselves in the early years. Some sound card and optical drive bundles even featured a full SCSI bus. Modern IDE/ATAPI compliant Parallel ATA and Serial ATA drive control chipsets and their interface technology is more complex to manufacture than a traditional 8bit 50 Mhz SCSI drive interface, because they feature properties of both the SCSI and ATA bus, but are cheaper to make overall due to economies of scale.

When the optical disc drive was first developed, it was not easy to add to computer systems. Some computers such as the IBM PS/2 were standardizing on the 3 1/2-inch floppy and 3 1/2-inch hard disk and did not include a place for a large internal device. Also IBM PCs and clones at first only included a single (parallel) ATA drive interface, which by the time the CD-ROM was introduced, was already being used to support two hard drives and were completely incapable of supporting removable media, a drive falling off or being removed from the bus while the system was live, would cause an unrecoverable error and crash the entire system. Early consumer grade laptops simply had no built-in high-speed interface for supporting an external storage device. High-end workstation systems and laptops featured a SCSI interface which had a standard for externally connected devices.

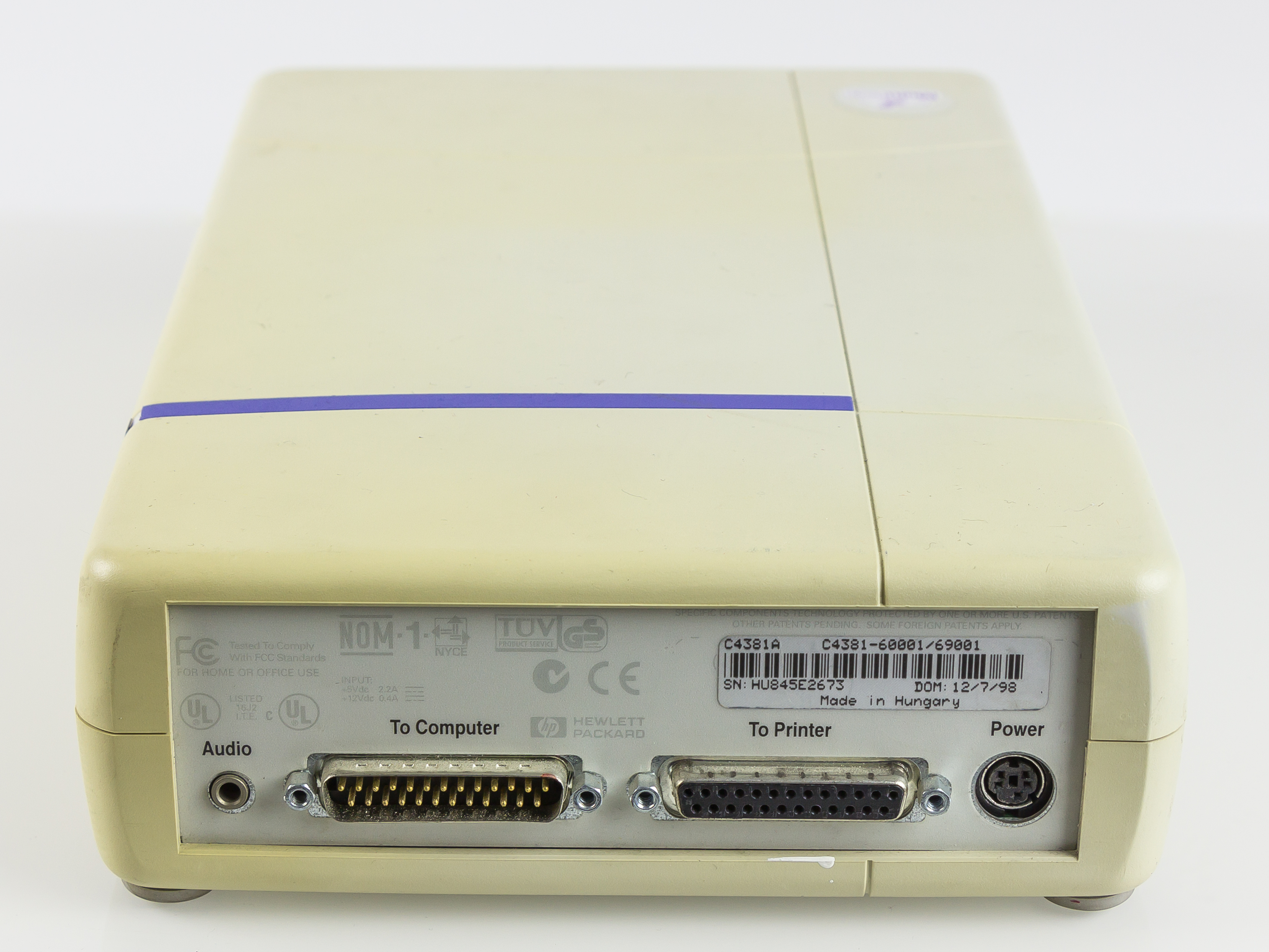
HP C4381A CD-Writer Plus 7200 Series (1998), showing parallel ports to connect between a printer and the computer

This was solved through several techniques:

- Early sound cards could include a CD-ROM drive interface. Initially, such interfaces were proprietary to each CD-ROM manufacturer. A sound card could often have two or three different interfaces which are able to communicate with the CD-ROM drive.
- A method for using the parallel port to use with external drives was developed at some point. This interface was traditionally used to connect a printer, but despite popular myth it is not its only use and various different external auxiliary devices exist for the IEEE-1278 bus, including but not limited to tape backup drives etc. This was slow but an option for low-to-midrange laptops without integrated or PCMCIA extension bus connected SCSI.
- A PCMCIA optical drive interface was also developed for laptops.
- A SCSI card could be installed in desktop PCs to cater for an external SCSI drive enclosure or to run internally mounted SCSI Hard disk drives and optical drives, though SCSI was typically somewhat more expensive than other options, with some OEMs charging a premium for it.

Due to lack of asynchrony in existing implementations, an optical drive encountering damaged sectors may cause computer programs trying to access the drives, such as Windows Explorer, to lock up.

=== SCSI configuration ===
Drive models may support adjustment of behavioural parameters for performance optimization and testing purposes, such as the read retry count (RRC), write retry count (WRC), and the option to deactivate error correction (DCR). For example, the read retry count specifies how often the drive should attempt reading a damaged sector. A higher value may increase the chance of successfully reading individual damaged sectors, but at the expense of responsiveness, since it adds delays during which the device seems unresponsive to the computer.

The sdparm command-line utility allows manually controlling such parameters. For example, sdparm --set RRC=10 /dev/sr0 sets the read retry count to 10 for the optical drive device file "sr0", and sdparm --all /dev/sr0 lists all code pages. The values may be interpreted varyingly among drive models or vendors.

=== Internal mechanism of a drive ===
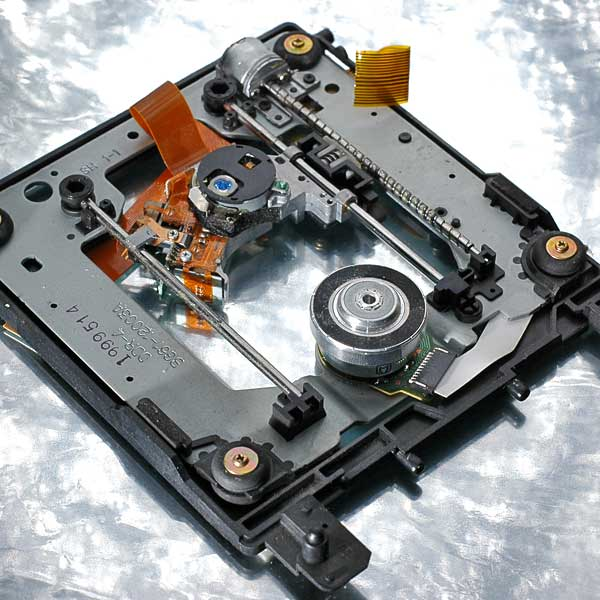
Internal mechanism of a DVD-ROM Drive. See text for details.

The optical drives in the photos are shown right side up; the disc would sit on top of them. The laser and optical system scans the underside of the disc.

With reference to the top photo, just to the right of image center is the disc motor, a metal cylinder, with a gray centering hub and black rubber drive ring on top. There is a disc-shaped round clamp, loosely held inside the cover and free to rotate; it's not in the photo. After the disc tray stops moving inward, as the motor and its attached parts rise, a magnet near the top of the rotating assembly contacts and strongly attracts the clamp to hold and center the disc. This motor is an "outrunner"-style brushless DC motor which has an external rotor – every visible part of it spins.

Two parallel guide rods that run between upper left and lower right in the photo carry the "sled", the moving optical read-write head. As shown, this "sled" is close to, or at the position where it reads or writes at the edge of the disc. To move the "sled" during continuous read or write operations, a stepper motor rotates a leadscrew to move the "sled" throughout its total travel range. The motor, itself, is the short gray cylinder just to the left of the most-distant shock mount; its shaft is parallel to the support rods. The leadscrew is the rod with evenly-spaced darker details; these are the helical grooves that engage a pin on the "sled".

In contrast, the mechanism shown in the second photo, which comes from a cheaply made DVD player, uses less accurate and less efficient brushed DC motors to both move the sled and spin the disc. Some older drives use a DC motor to move the sled, but also have a magnetic rotary encoder to keep track of the position. Most drives in computers use stepper motors.

The gray metal chassis is shock-mounted at its four corners to reduce sensitivity to external shocks, and to reduce drive noise from residual imbalance when running fast. The soft shock mount grommets are just below the brass-colored screws at the four corners (the left one is obscured).

In the third photo, the components under the cover of the lens mechanism are visible. The two permanent magnets on either side of the lens holder as well as the coils that move the lens can be seen. This allows the lens to be moved up, down, forwards, and backwards to stabilize the focus of the beam.

In the fourth photo, the inside of the optics package can be seen. Note that since this is a CD-ROM drive, there is only one laser, which is the black component mounted to the bottom left of the assembly. Just above the laser are the first focusing lens and prism that direct the beam at the disc. The tall, thin object in the center is a half-silvered mirror that splits the laser beam in multiple directions. To the bottom right of the mirror is the main photodiode that senses the beam reflected off the disc. Above the main photodiode is a second photodiode that is used to sense and regulate the power of the laser.

The irregular orange material is flexible etched copper foil supported by thin sheet plastic; these are "flexible circuits" that connect everything to the electronics (which is not shown).

== History ==
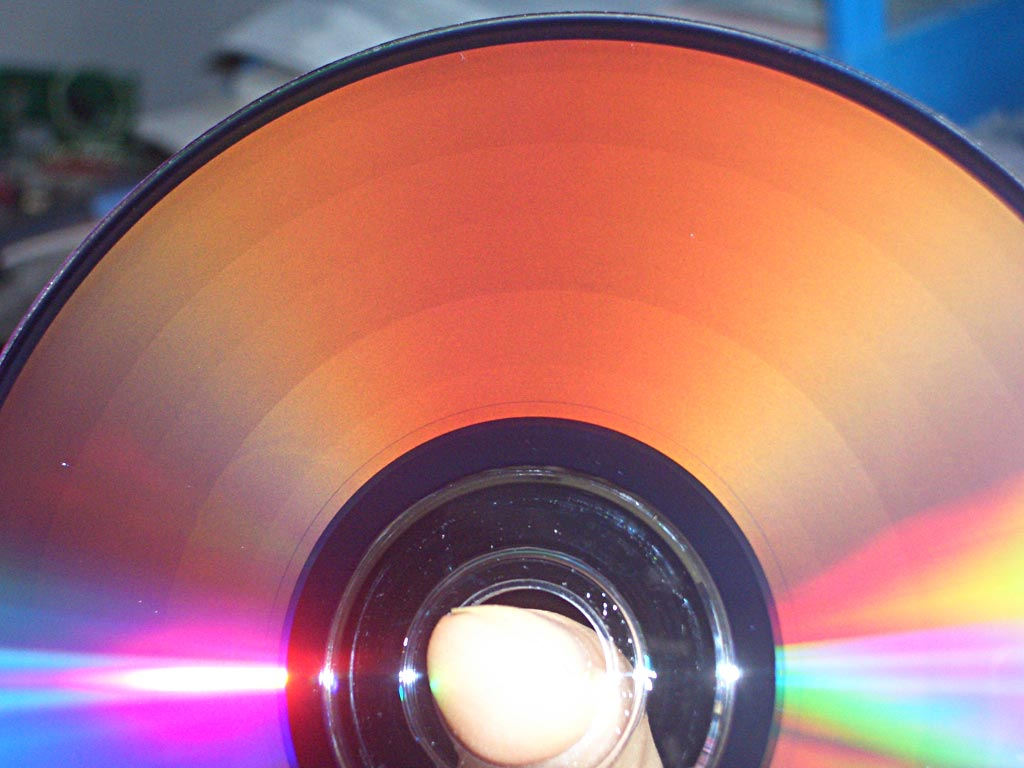
The Z-CLV recording pattern is easily visible after burning a DVD-R.

The first laser disc, demonstrated in 1972, was the Laservision 12-inch video disc. The video signal was stored as an analog format like a video cassette. The first digitally recorded optical disc was a 5-inch audio compact disc (CD) in a read-only format created by Sony and Philips in 1975.

The first erasable optical disc drives were announced in 1983, by Matsushita (Panasonic), Sony, and Kokusai Denshin Denwa (KDDI). Sony eventually released the first commercial erasable and rewritable 5 1/4-inch optical disc drive in 1987, with dual-sided discs capable of holding 325 MB per side.

The CD-ROM format was developed by Sony and Denon, introduced in 1984, as an extension of Compact Disc Digital Audio and adapted to hold any form of digital data. The CD-ROM format has a storage capacity of 650 MB. Also in 1984, Sony introduced a LaserDisc data storage format, with a larger data capacity of 3.28 GB.

In September 1992, Sony announced the MiniDisc format, which was supposed to combine the audio clarity of CD's and the convenience of a cassette size. The standard capacity holds 80 minutes of audio. In January 2004, Sony revealed an upgraded Hi-MD format, which increased the capacity to 1 GB (48 hours of audio).

The DVD format, developed by Panasonic, Sony, and Toshiba, was released in 1995, and was capable of holding 4.7 GB per layer; with the first DVD players shipping on November 1, 1996, by Panasonic and Toshiba in Japan and the first DVD-ROM compatible computers being shipped on November 6 of that year by Fujitsu. Sales of DVD-ROM drives for computers in the U.S. began on March 24, 1997, when Creative Labs released their PC-DVD kit to the market.

In 1999, Kenwood released a multi-beam optical drive that achieved burning speeds as high as 72×, which would require dangerous spinning speeds to attain with single-beam burning. However, it suffered from reliability issues.

The first Blu-ray prototype was unveiled by Sony in October 2000, and the first commercial recording device was released to market on April 10, 2003. In January 2005, TDK announced that they had developed an ultra-hard yet very thin polymer coating ("Durabis") for Blu-ray Discs; this was a significant technical advance because better protection was desired for the consumer market to protect bare discs against scratching and damage compared to DVD. Technically Blu-ray Disc also required a thinner layer for the narrower beam and shorter wavelength 'blue' laser. The first BD-ROM players (Samsung BD-P1000) were shipped in mid-June 2006. The first Blu-ray Disc titles were released by Sony and MGM on June 20, 2006. The first mass-market Blu-ray Disc rewritable drive for the PC was the BWU-100A, released by Sony on July 18, 2006.

Starting in the mid-2010s, computer manufacturers began to stop including built-in optical disc drives on their products, with the advent of cheap, rugged (scratches can not cause corrupted data, inaccessible files or skipping audio/video), fast and high capacity USB drives and video on demand over the internet. Excluding an optical drive allows for circuit boards in laptops to be larger and less dense, requiring less layers, reducing production costs while also reducing weight and thickness, or for batteries to be larger. Computer case manufacturers also began to stop including 5 1/4-inch bays for installing optical disc drives. However, new optical disc drives are still (as of 2020) available for purchase. Notable optical disc drive OEMs include Hitachi, LG Electronics (merged into Hitachi-LG Data Storage), Toshiba, Samsung Electronics (merged into Toshiba Samsung Storage Technology), Sony, NEC (merged into Optiarc), Lite-On, Philips (merged into Philips & Lite-On Digital Solutions), Pioneer Corporation, Plextor, Panasonic, Yamaha Corporation and Kenwood.

In May 2025, Pioneer exited the optical disc market. In August 2026, reports emerged that the amount of disc manufacturing facilities was declining, with components required to make optical disc drives also becoming harder to source.

== Compatibility ==
Most optical drives are backward compatible with their ancestors up to CD, although this is not required by standards.

Compared to a CD's 1.2 mm layer of polycarbonate, a DVD's laser beam only has to penetrate 0.6 mm in order to reach the recording surface. This allows a DVD drive to focus the beam on a smaller spot size and to read smaller pits. DVD lens supports a different focus for CD or DVD media with same laser. With the newer Blu-ray Disc drives, the laser only has to penetrate 0.1 mm of material. Thus the optical assembly would normally have to have an even greater focus range. In practice, the Blu-ray optical system is separate from the DVD/CD system.

Optical disc drive	Optical disc or optical media															
Optical disc drive	Pressed CD	CD-R	CD-RW	Pressed DVD	DVD-R	DVD+R	DVD-RW	DVD+RW	DVD+R DL	Pressed CAT BD	BD-R	BD-RE	BD-R DL	BD-RE DL	BD-R XL	BD-RE XL
Audio CD player	Read	Read ^{1}	Read ^{2} ^{12}	None	None	None	None	None	None	None	None	None	None	None	None	None
CD-ROM drive	Read	Read ^{1}	Read ^{2}	None	None	None	None	None	None	None	None	None	None	None	None	None
CD-R recorder	Read	Write	Read	None	None	None	None	None	None	None	None	None	None	None	None	None
CD-RW recorder	Read	Write	Write	None	None	None	None	None	None	None	None	None	None	None	None	None
DVD-ROM drive	Read	Read ^{3}	Read ^{3}	Read	Read ^{4}	Read ^{4}	Read ^{4}	Read ^{4}	Read ^{5}	None	None	None	None	None	None	None
DVD-R recorder	Read	Write	Write	Read	Write	Read ^{6}	Read	Read ^{6}	Read ^{5}	None	None	None	None	None	None	None
DVD-RW recorder	Read	Write	Write	Read	Write	Read ^{7}	Write ^{8}	Read ^{6}	Read ^{5}	None	None	None	None	None	None	None
DVD+RW recorder	Read	Write	Write	Read	Read ^{6}	Read ^{9}	Read ^{6}	Write	Read ^{5}	None	None	None	None	None	None	None
DVD+R recorder	Read	Write	Write	Read	Read ^{6}	Write	Read ^{6}	Write	Read ^{5}	None	None	None	None	None	None	None
DVD±RW recorder	Read	Write	Write	Read	Write	Write	Write	Write	Read ^{5}	None	None	None	None	None	None	None
DVD±RW/DVD+R DL recorder^{13}	Read	Write	Write	Read	Write ^{10}	Write	Write ^{10}	Write	Write	None	None	None	None	None	None	None
BD-ROM	Read	Read	Read	Read	Read	Read	Read	Read	Read	Read	Read	Read	Read	Read	None	None
BD-R recorder	Read ^{11}	Write ^{11}	Write ^{11}	Read	Write	Write	Write	Write	Write	Read	Write	Read	Read	Read	None	None
BD-RE recorder	Read ^{11}	Write ^{11}	Write ^{11}	Read	Write	Write	Write	Write	Write	Read	Write	Write	Read	Read	None	None
BD-R DL recorder	Read ^{11}	Write ^{11}	Write ^{11}	Read	Write	Write	Write	Write	Write	Read	Write	Write	Write	Read	None	None
BD-RE DL recorder	Read ^{11}	Write ^{11}	Write ^{11}	Read	Write	Write	Write	Write	Write	Read	Write	Write	Write	Write	None	None
BD-ROM XL	Read	Read	Read	Read	Read	Read	Read	Read	Read	Read	Read	Read	Read	Read	Read	Read
BD-R XL recorder	Read ^{11}	Write ^{11}	Write ^{11}	Read	Write	Write	Write	Write	Write	Read	Write	Write	Write	Write	Write	Read
BD-RE XL recorder	Read ^{11}	Write ^{11}	Write ^{11}	Read	Write	Write	Write	Write	Write	Read	Write	Write	Write	Write	Write	Write

- ^1 Some types of CD-R media with less-reflective dyes may cause problems.
- ^2 May not work in non MultiRead-compliant drives.
- ^3 May not work in some early-model DVD-ROM drives. CD-R would not work in any drive that did not have a 780 nm laser. CD-RW compatibility varied.
- ^4 DVD+RW discs did not work in early video players that played DVD-RW discs. This was not due to any incompatibility with the format but was a deliberate feature built into the firmware by one drive manufacturer.
- ^5 Read compatibility with existing DVD drives may vary greatly with the brand of DVD+R DL media used. Also drives that predated the media did not have the book code for DVD+R DL media in their firmware (this was not an issue for DVD-R DL though some drives could only read the first layer).
- ^6 Early DVD+RW and DVD+R recorders could not write to DVD-R(W) media (and vice versa).
- ^7 Will work in all drives that read DVD-R as compatibility ID byte is the same.
- ^8 Recorder firmware may blacklist or otherwise refuse to record to some brands of DVD-RW media.
- ^9 DVD+RW format was released before DVD+R. All DVD+RW only drives could be upgraded to write DVD+R discs by a firmware upgrade.
- ^10 As of April 2005, all DVD+R DL recorders on the market are Super Multi-capable.
- ^11 As of October 2006, recently released BD drives are able to read and write CD media.
- ^12 Older CD player models might struggle with the low reflectivity of CD-RW media.
- ^13 Also known as "DVD Multi Recorder"

== Recording performance ==
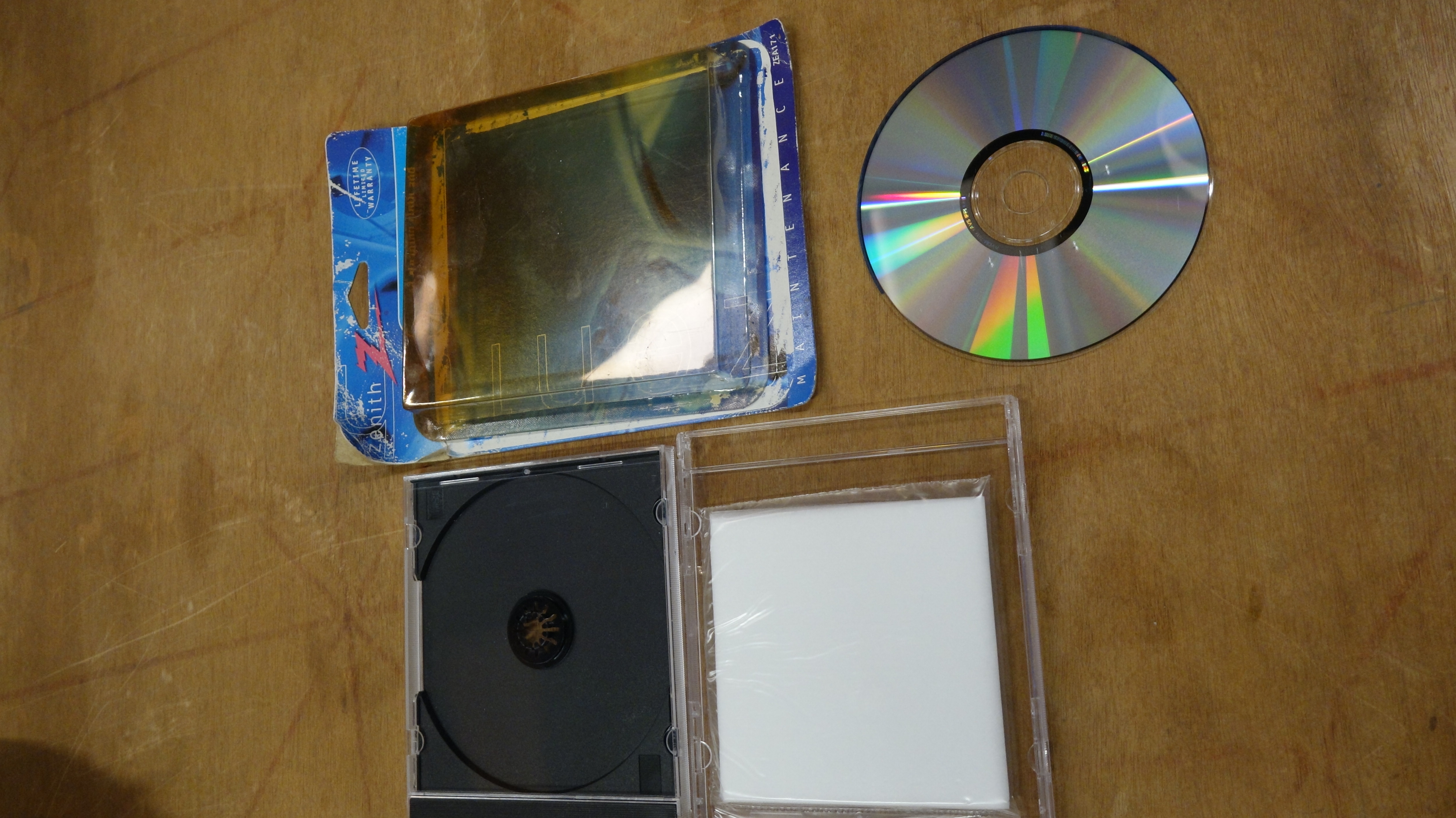
Cleaner CDs, with brushes, were available aftermarket

During the times of CD writer drives, they are often marked with three different speed ratings. In these cases, the first speed is for write-once (R) operations, the second speed for re-write (RW) operations, and the last speed for read-only (ROM) operations. For example, a 40×/16×/48× CD writer drive is capable of writing to CD-R media at speed of 40× (6,000 kbit/s), writing to CD-RW media at speed of 16× (2,400 kbit/s), and reading from a CD-ROM media at speed of 48× (7,200 kbit/s).

During the times of combo (CD-RW/DVD-ROM) drives, an additional speed rating (e.g. the 16× in 52×/32×/52×/16×) is designated for DVD-ROM media reading operations.

For DVD writer drives, Blu-ray Disc combo drives, and Blu-ray Disc writer drives, the writing and reading speed of their respective optical media are specified in its retail box, user's manual, or bundled brochures or pamphlets.

In the late 1990s, buffer underruns became a very common problem as high-speed CD recorders began to appear in home and office computers, which—for a variety of reasons—often could not muster the I/O performance to keep the data stream to the recorder steadily fed. The recorder, should it run short, would be forced to halt the recording process, leaving a truncated track that usually renders the disc useless.

In response, manufacturers of CD recorders began shipping drives with "buffer underrun protection" (under various trade names, such as Sanyo's "BURN-Proof", Ricoh's "JustLink" and Yamaha's "Lossless Link"). These can suspend and resume the recording process in such a way that the gap the stoppage produces can be dealt with by the error-correcting logic built into CD players and CD-ROM drives. The first of these drives were rated at 12× and 16×.

The first optical drive to support recording DVDs at 16× speed was the Pioneer DVR-108, released in the second half of 2004. At that time however, no recordable DVD media supported that high recording speed yet.

While drives are burning DVD+R, DVD+RW and all Blu-ray formats, they do not require any such error correcting recovery as the recorder is able to place the new data exactly on the end of the suspended write effectively producing a continuous track (this is what the DVD+ technology achieved). Although later interfaces were able to stream data at the required speed, many drives now write in a 'zoned constant linear velocity' ("Z-CLV"). This means that the drive has to temporarily suspend the write operation while it changes speed and then recommence it once the new speed is attained. This is handled in the same manner as a buffer underrun.

The internal buffer of optical disc writer drives is: 8 MiB or 4 MiB when recording BD-R, BD-R DL, BD-RE, or BD-RE DL media; 2 MiB when recording DVD-R, DVD-RW, DVD-R DL, DVD+R, DVD+RW, DVD+R DL, DVD-RAM, CD-R, or CD-RW media.

== Recording schemes ==
CD recording on personal computers was originally a batch-oriented task in that it required specialised authoring software to create an "image" of the data to record and to record it to disc in the one session. This was acceptable for archival purposes, but limited the general convenience of CD-R and CD-RW discs as a removable storage medium.

Packet writing is a scheme in which the recorder writes incrementally to disc in short bursts, or packets. Sequential packet writing fills the disc with packets from bottom up. To make it readable in CD-ROM and DVD-ROM drives, the disc can be closed at any time by writing a final table-of-contents to the start of the disc; thereafter, the disc cannot be packet-written any further. Packet writing, together with support from the operating system and a file system like UDF, can be used to mimic random write-access as in media like flash memory and magnetic disks.

Fixed-length packet writing (on CD-RW and DVD-RW media) divides up the disc into padded, fixed-size packets. The padding reduces the capacity of the disc, but allows the recorder to start and stop recording on an individual packet without affecting its neighbours. These resemble the block-writable access offered by magnetic media closely enough that many conventional file systems will work as-is. Such discs, however, are not readable in most CD-ROM and DVD-ROM drives or on most operating systems without additional third-party drivers. The division into packets is not as reliable as it may seem as CD-R(W) and DVD-R(W) drives can only locate data to within a data block. Although generous gaps (the padding referred to above) are left between blocks, the drive nevertheless can occasionally miss and either destroy some existing data or even render the disc unreadable.

The DVD+RW disc format eliminates this unreliability by embedding more accurate timing hints in the data groove of the disc and allowing individual data blocks (or even bytes) to be replaced without affecting backward compatibility (a feature dubbed "lossless linking"). The format itself was designed to deal with discontinuous recording because it was expected to be widely used in digital video recorders. Many such DVRs use variable-rate video compression schemes which require them to record in short bursts; some allow simultaneous playback and recording by alternating quickly between recording to the tail of the disc whilst reading from elsewhere. The Blu-ray Disc system also encompasses this technology.

Mount Rainier aims to make packet-written CD-RW and DVD+RW discs as convenient to use as that of removable magnetic media by having the firmware format new discs in the background and manage media defects (by automatically mapping parts of the disc which have been worn out by erase cycles to reserve space elsewhere on the disc). As of February 2007, support for Mount Rainier is natively supported in Windows Vista. All previous versions of Windows require a third-party solution, as does Mac OS X.

=== Recorder Unique Identifier ===
Owing to pressure from the music industry, as represented by the IFPI and RIAA, Philips developed the Recorder Identification Code (RID) to allow media to be uniquely associated with the recorder that has written it. This standard is contained in the Rainbow Books. The RID-Code consists of a supplier code (e.g. "PHI" for Philips), a model number and the unique ID of the recorder. Quoting Philips, the RID "enables a trace for each disc back to the exact machine on which it was made using coded information in the recording itself. The use of the RID code is mandatory."

Although the RID was introduced for music and video industry purposes, the RID is included on every disc written by every drive, including data and backup discs. The value of the RID is questionable as it is (currently) impossible to locate any individual recorder due to there being no database.

=== Source Identification Code ===
The Source Identification Code (SID) is an eight character supplier code that is placed on optical discs by the manufacturer. The SID identifies not only manufacturer, but also the individual factory and machine that produced the disc.

According to Phillips, the administrator of the SID codes, the SID code provides an optical disc production facility with the means to identify all discs mastered or replicated in its plant, including the specific Laser Beam Recorder (LBR) signal processor or mould that produced a particular stamper or disc.

=== Use of RID and SID together in forensics ===
The standard use of RID and SID mean that each disc written contains a record of the machine that produced a disc (the SID), and which drive wrote it (the RID). This combined knowledge may be very useful to law enforcement, to investigative agencies, and to private or corporate investigators.

A significant motivation for introducing the SID code was to identify disc manufacturing plants producing unauthorised copies of commercial CDs. By the 1990s, the production process for CDs had evolved from requiring a "clean-room" environment involving multiple processes, this demanding a substantial investment and likely to be confined to "responsible" organisations, into an activity that could be undertaken with "mono-liner" equipment, this having been developed in the late 1980s and capable of packaging "the whole process into a single box" that could occupy "no more space than a couple of office desks". Consequently, the CD manufacturing industry had grown to include less reputable organisations and, by 1994, could produce a volume of discs twice that of the estimated demand for "legitimate CDs", with music industry organisations claiming that illicit copies were outselling legitimate copies by significant margins in some markets. Philips and the IFPI envisaged that combinations of codes, each identifying a disc mastering establishment and the manufacturing plant used to make a particular disc, would assist in identifying those responsible for illicit CD production. However, the scheme relied on existing manufacturing plants upgrading their equipment to support the introduction of this measure, and the accompanying challenge of convincing such facilities was perceived as "a little difficult" in cases where those facilities were already involved in making considerable numbers of illicit discs.

== See also ==
- Computer hardware
- Cue sheet (music software)
- Floptical
- ISO image
- List of optical disc authoring software
- MultiLevel Recording
- Optical disc authoring
- Optical disc recording technologies
- Optical jukebox
- Phase-change Dual
- Receiver (radio)
- Ripping
