= CD-RW =

Optical disk technology

Logo of Compact Disc-ReWritable (CD-RW).

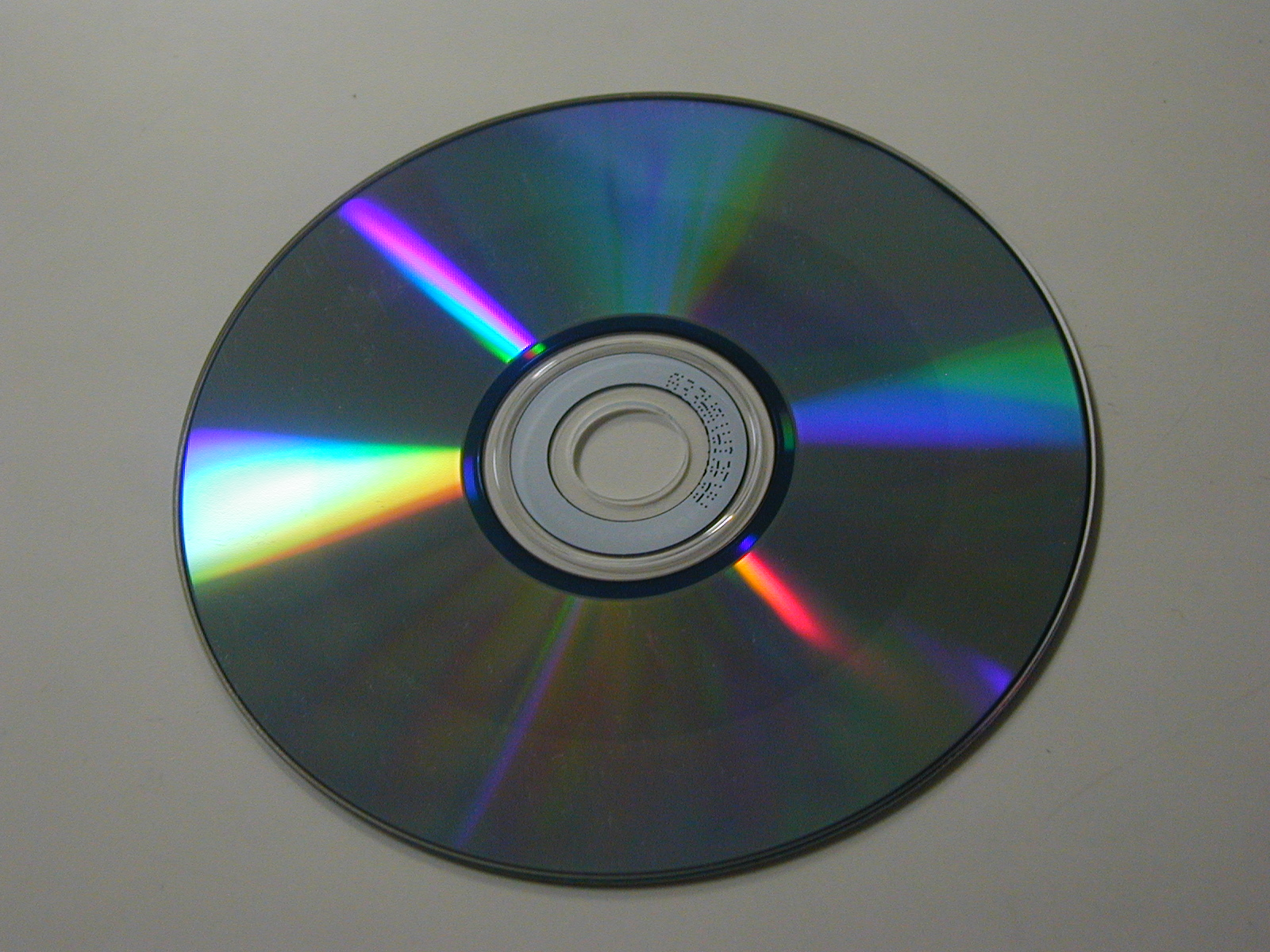
CD-RW with distinctively darker data surface than a CD-R and a factory-pressed CD-ROM.

CD-RW (Compact Disc-Rewritable) is a digital optical disc storage format introduced by Ricoh in 1997. A CD-RW compact disc (CD-RWs) can be written, read, erased, and re-written.

CD-RWs, as opposed to CDs, require specialized readers that have sensitive laser optics. Consequently, CD-RWs cannot be read in many CD readers built prior to the introduction of CD-RW. CD-ROM drives with a "MultiRead" certification are compatible.

CD-RWs must be erased or blanked before reuse. Erasure methods include full blanking where the entire surface of the disc is erased and fast blanking where only metadata areas, such as PMA, TOC and pregap, are cleared. Fast blanking is quicker and usually sufficient to allow rewriting the disc. Full blanking removes all traces of the previous data, and is often used for confidentiality purposes.

CD-RWs can sustain fewer re-writes compared to other storage media (ca. 1,000 compared up to 100,000). They are ideally used for test discs (e.g. for CD authoring), temporary backups, and as a middle-ground between online and offline storage schemes.

== CD-MO ==
Before CD-RW technology, in 1990 a standard for magneto-optical recordable and erasable CDs called CD-MO was introduced and set in the Orange Book, part 1 as a CD with a magneto-optical recording layer. The CD-MO standard allowed for an optional non-erasable zone on the disc that could be read by CD-ROM units.

Data recording (and erasing) was achieved by heating the magneto-optical layer's material (e.g. DyFeCo or less often TbFeCo or GdFeCo) to its Curie point and then using a magnetic field to write the new data, in a manner essentially identical to Sony's MiniDisc and other magneto-optical formats. Because reading CD-MO discs relied on the Kerr effect, they could only be read in special drives and were incompatible with standard CD readers. The format was never released commercially, mostly because of incompatibility with standard CD readers.

Since the CD-MO was otherwise identical to CDs, the format still adopted a spiral-groove recording scheme, rendering the disc poorly suited as a removable medium for repeated, small-scale deletions and recordings. Some magneto-optical drives and media with the same form factor do not have this limitation. Unlike CD-RW, CD-MO allowed for hybrid discs containing both an unmodifiable, pressed section, readable in standard drives, and a writable MO section.

The early introduction and no standards for disc recording software, file systems, and formats, physical incompatibility, coupled with more economical CD-R discs, led to abandoning the format. Other magneto-optical media, unbound by limitations of the typical CD-ROM filesystems, found market success instead of the CD-MO.

== Mechanism of action ==
Rewritable media can, with suitable hardware, be re-written up to 100,000 times. The CD-RW is based on phase change technology, with a degree of reflection at 15–25%, compared to 40–70% for CD-R discs. The properties of the medium and the write and erase procedure is defined in the Orange Book Part III.

To maintain a precise rotation speed, tracks have a slight superimposed sinusoidal excursion of 0.3 µm at a frequency of 22.05 kHz. In addition a 1 kHz frequency modulation is applied to provide the recorder with an absolute time reference. Groove width is 0.6 μm and pitch of 1.6 μm.

The media for CD-RW has the same layers as CD-R media. The reflective layer is, however, a silver-indium-antimony-tellurium (AgInSbTe) alloy with a polycrystalline structure and reflective properties in its original state. When writing the laser beam uses its maximum power (8-14 mW) to heat the material to 500–700 °C causing material liquefaction. In this state, the alloy loses its polycrystalline structure and reflectivity and assumes an amorphous state. The lost reflectivity serves the same function as pits on stamped CDs. The scanning signal when reading is created by strong or weak reflection of the laser beam. To erase the disc, the write beam heats the amorphous regions with low power to about 200 °C. The alloy is not melted, but returns to the polycrystalline state and is again reflective.

== Authoring ==
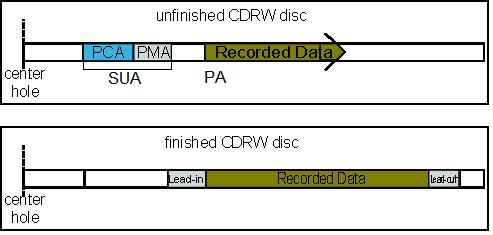
Data structure on a CD-RW

During and after a disc authoring the distribution of data on the CD-RW varies. The following areas are present:

- PCA: The Power Calibration Area is used to determine the correct power level for the laser.
- PMA: The Program Memory Area of a CD-RW is a record of the data recorded on an unfinished or unfinalized disc. It is used as a transition TOC while the session is still open. PMA records may contain information on up to 99 audio tracks and their start and stop times (CD-DA), or sector addresses for the start of data files for each session on a data CD.
- PA: The Program Area contains the audio tracks or data files.
- SUA: The System User Area The PCA and the PMA grouped together are sometimes denoted as the System User Area.

Each session on a multi-session disc has a corresponding lead-in, PMA, PA and lead-out. When the session is closed TOC information in the PMA is written into a lead-in area and the PCA and PMA are logically eliminated. The lead-out is created to mark the end of the data in the session.

== Speed specifications ==
Specification	Logo	Speed
(Original, "slow")		1×, 2×, 4×
High Speed		8×, 10×, 12×
Ultra Speed		16×, 20×, 24×
Ultra Speed+		32×

Philips created the "High-Speed" CD-RW logo for media that supports writing speeds above 4×.

Like a CD-R, a CD-RW has hardcoded speed specifications which limit recording speeds to fairly restrictive ranges. Unlike a CD-R, a CD-RW has a minimum writing speed under which the discs cannot be recorded, based on the phase change material's heating and cooling time constants and the required laser energy levels. Despite this, some professional audio CD recorders, such as those made by Tascam, use special techniques to bypass these limitations and can record high speed (but not ultra speed) discs in realtime.

Since the CD-RW discs need to be blanked before recording data, writing too slowly or with too low energy on a high speed unblanked disc will cause the phase change layer to cool before blanking is achieved, preventing the data from being properly written.

Similarly, using inappropriately high amounts of laser energy will cause the material to overheat and be insensitive to the data, a situation typical of slower discs used in a high powered and fast specification drive.

For these reasons, older CD-RW drives that lack appropriate firmware and hardware are not compatible with newer, high-speed CD-RW discs, while newer drives can record to older CD-RW discs, provided their firmware correct speed, delay, and power settings can be appropriately set.

The actual reading speed of CD-RW discs, however, is not directly correlated or bound to speed specification, but depends primarily on the reading drive's capabilities.

Many half-height CD and DVD writers released between 2004 and 2010, including the TSSTcorp SH-M522 combo drive (2004), Pioneer DVR-110D (2005), Hitachi-LG GSA-4167 (2005), TSSTcorp SH-S182/S183 (2006) and SH-S203/TS-H653B (2007) have officially adapted support for CD-RW UltraSpeed Plus (32× Z-CLV), while more recent DVD writers such as the SH-224DB (2013) and Blu-Ray writers such as the LG BE16NU50 (2016) have downgraded the backwards compatibility to CD-RW UltraSpeed (24× Z-CLV).

Slim type optical drives are subject to physical limitations, thus are not able to attain rotation speeds of half-height (desktop) optical drives. They usually support CD-RW writing speeds of 16× or 24× Z-CLV in zones of 10× CLV, 16× CLV, 20× CLV and 24× CLV towards the outer edge, of which the highest speed zone depends on availability.

== See also ==
- List of optical disc manufacturers
