= Constant linear velocity =

Qualifier for the rated speed of an optical disc drive

Comparison of several forms of disk storage showing tracks (not-to-scale); green denotes start and red denotes end. * Some CD-R(W) and DVD-R(W)/DVD+R(W) recorders operate in ZCLV, CAA or CAV modes.

In optical storage, constant linear velocity (CLV) is a qualifier for the rated speed of an optical disc drive, and may also be applied to the writing speed of recordable discs. CLV implies that the angular velocity (i.e. rpm) varies during an operation, as contrasted with CAV modes.

If the data density is the same everywhere on the disc, as is the case with CD and DVD and Blu-ray discs, the linear velocity directly correlates with the transfer rate (read speed or write speed), meaning an increase in linear velocity also increases the amount of data read from the disc in the same time, regardless of whether the laser is reading from or writing to the inner edge or the outer edge of the data area. At any disc rotation speed (angular velocity), the linear velocity is higher at the outer edge than at the inner edge of the disc, given that the outer edge travels a longer distance.

The concept of constant linear velocity was patented in 1886 by phonograph pioneers Chichester Bell and Charles Tainter.

== History ==
LaserDiscs, the first consumer optical discs, used constant linear velocity to double playback time (CLV / "extended play" discs can hold 1 hour per side; CAV / "standard play" discs can only hold 30 minutes). As the motor's speed decreases from 1,800 to 600 rpm when the read head moves away from the center (which is the start of the recording), the disc moves past the read head at a constant speed.

Later optical formats such as the audio CD also employ CLV to maintain both a constant data rate and a constant bit density. Their rotation gradually decreases from 495 to 212 rpm to keep the disc moving past the read laser at 1.2 m/s (3.9 ft/s) (assuming 1:1 playback speed and Red Book encoding).

To accommodate the higher data transfer rates and random access requirements of modern CD-ROM drives, CAV systems are used. This is because seek performance would be greatly affected during random access by the requirement to continually modulate the disc's rotation speed to be appropriate for the read head's position.

== Dimensions ==
Dimensions of a standard-size (12cm diameter) optical disc

In case of a 12 cm standard diameter disc, data at the inner edge of the so-called program area, the area containing the data (2.5 cm from disc center) is accessed at 2.4 times the angular (rotation) speed of the disc compared to at the outer edge (6 cm from disc center).

For a miniature disc with a diameter of 8 cm (radius of 4 cm), the angular (rotation) speed ratio of outer to inner data edge is 1.6 if accessed at a constant linear velocity.

This means that, for example, at a constant linear velocity of ×10, the equivalent angular velocity of the disc is ×24 while the being accessed at the inner data area, while being ×10 during access at the outermost edge.

== Zoned constant linear velocity ==
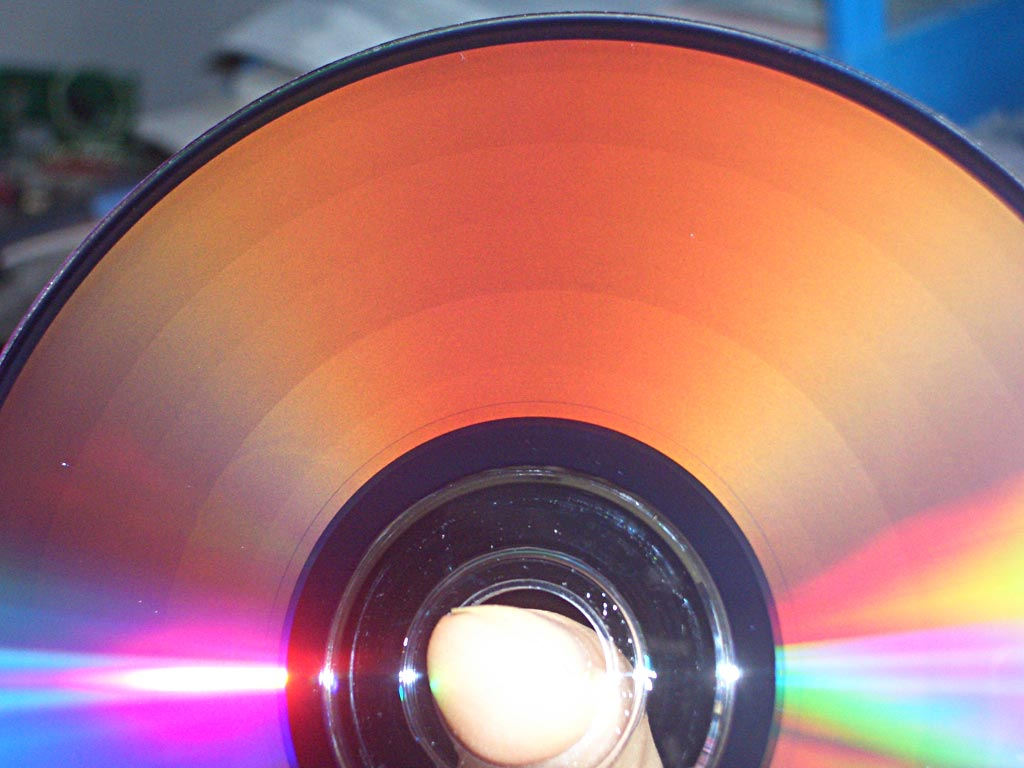
The Zone-CLV recording strategy is easily visible after burning a DVD-R

Zoned constant linear velocity (ZCLV or Z-CLV) is a modification of CLV for high speed CD and DVD recorders where a constant linear velocity is maintained until the next zone, when the speed is stepped up. Early model recorders were CLV drives. The recording speed on such drives was rated in multiples of 150 KiB/s; a 4X drive, for instance, would write steadily at around 600 KiB/s. The transfer rate was kept constant by having the spindle motor in the drive vary in speed and run 2.4 times as fast when recording at the inner rim of the disc as on the outer rim. Some high-speed recorders use the zoned CLV method (ZCLV), which divides the disc into stepped zones, each of which has its own constant linear velocity. When the current zone is finished and the next zone is reached, the disc rotation will speed up, usually to the same angular speed as at the beginning of the previous zone.

At higher speeds, ZCLV offers a compromise between CAV, which enables faster seek times, and CLV, which enables greater writing reliability. A ZCLV recorder rated at "52X", for example, would write at a 52X disc rpm on the innermost zone and then progressively step down to 20X disc rpm at the outer rim to keep the rate at which bits are recorded by the laser within a narrow range. This method is used for higher-speed CD-RW variants due to the narrow writing speed range of rewriteable media.

== Constant angular acceleration ==
Constant angular acceleration (CAA) is a variant of CLV that is used on the LaserDisc format. The initial specification of CLV (as it applies to LaserDisc) results in several playback artifacts being present in the audio/video portion as well as compatibility problems with LaserDisc players produced by different manufacturers.

In the mid 1980s, Pioneer Electronics introduced the CAA scheme, where the rotation speed of the LaserDisc was lowered in steps. This eliminated most playback artifacts and compatibility problems. Since its introduction, most manufacturers of LaserDiscs adopted the CAA format but still referred to their CAA-encoded product as CLV.

== See also ==
- Constant angular velocity (CAV)
- Zone bit recording (ZBR/ZCAV)
- Optical storage media writing and reading speed § Various optical disc formats writing/reading speeds
- Sirius 1/Victor 9000 diskette format utilizing ZCLV, ZBR with GCR
- Absolute Time in Pregroove
