= Constant angular velocity =

Qualifier for the rated speed of an optical disc drive

Comparison of several forms of disk storage showing tracks (not-to-scale); green denotes start and red denotes end. Note Apple 3.5–inch floppy disk drives used five speeds, increasing capacity by a quarter relative to simpler CAV drives. * Some CD-R(W) and DVD-R(W)/DVD+R(W) recorders operate in ZCLV, CAA or CAV modes.

In optical storage, constant angular velocity (CAV) is a qualifier for the rated speed of any disc containing information, and may also be applied to the writing speed of recordable discs. A drive or disc operating in CAV mode maintains a constant angular velocity, contrasted with a constant linear velocity (CLV).

A typical CD-ROM drive operates in CLV mode, in contrast to a floppy or hard disk drive, or gramophone, which operates in CAV mode. In CAV mode, the spindle motor turns at a constant speed, which makes the medium pass by the read/write head faster when the head is positioned at the outside of the disk. In contrast, in CLV mode, the spindle motor speed varies so that the medium passes by the head at the same speed regardless of where on the disk the head is positioned.

If the disk is recorded at the same areal density throughout, then when read or written in CAV mode, the data rate is higher for the outer tracks than for the inner tracks (because for the same rotation on the inner track, more distance is travelled on the outer track), whereas in CLV mode, the data rate is the same everywhere.

An advantage of CAV mode over CLV is that the drive mechanism is easier to engineer (and less expensive to build). Another advantage is that a device can switch from reading one part of a disk to reading another part more quickly, because in CLV mode, when the device moves the head in or out, it must change the speed of the disc.

== Dimensions ==
Dimensions of a standard-size (12 cm diameter) optical disc

In case of a 12 cm standard diameter disc, data at the outermost edge (6 cm from center) is accessed at 2.4 times the speed of data at the inner edge of the data-containing program area (2.5 cm from center).

For a miniature disc with a diameter of 8 cm (radius of 4 cm), the speed ratio of outer to inner data edge is 1.6.

This means that, for example, if a disc is accessed at a constant angular velocity of ×24, the equivalent linear velocity is ×24 while accessed at the outermost edge of the data area while being ×10 at the innermost data area.

== Uses ==
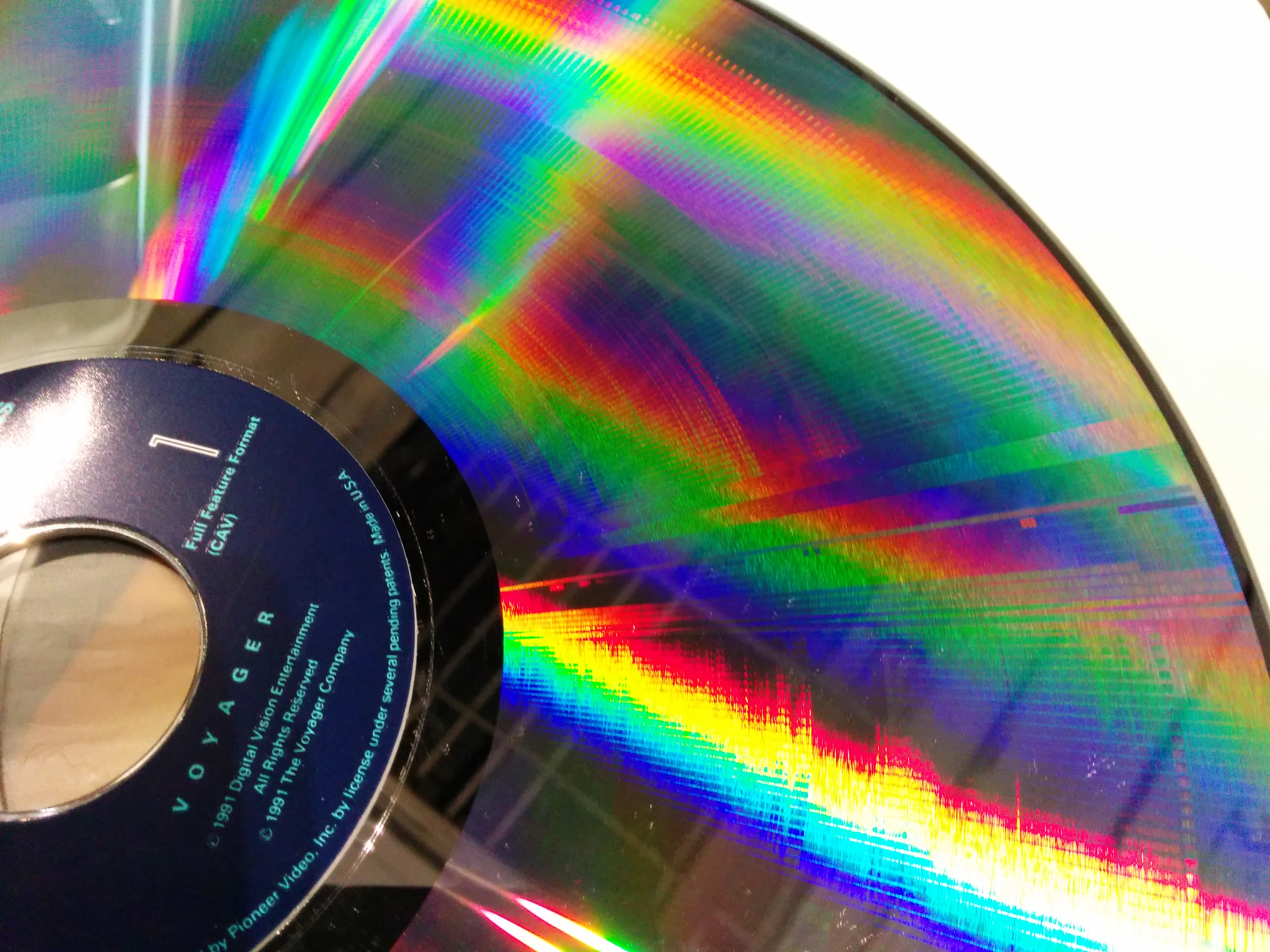
Constant-angular-velocity (CAV) LaserDisc, showing the NTSC field setup and individual scan lines

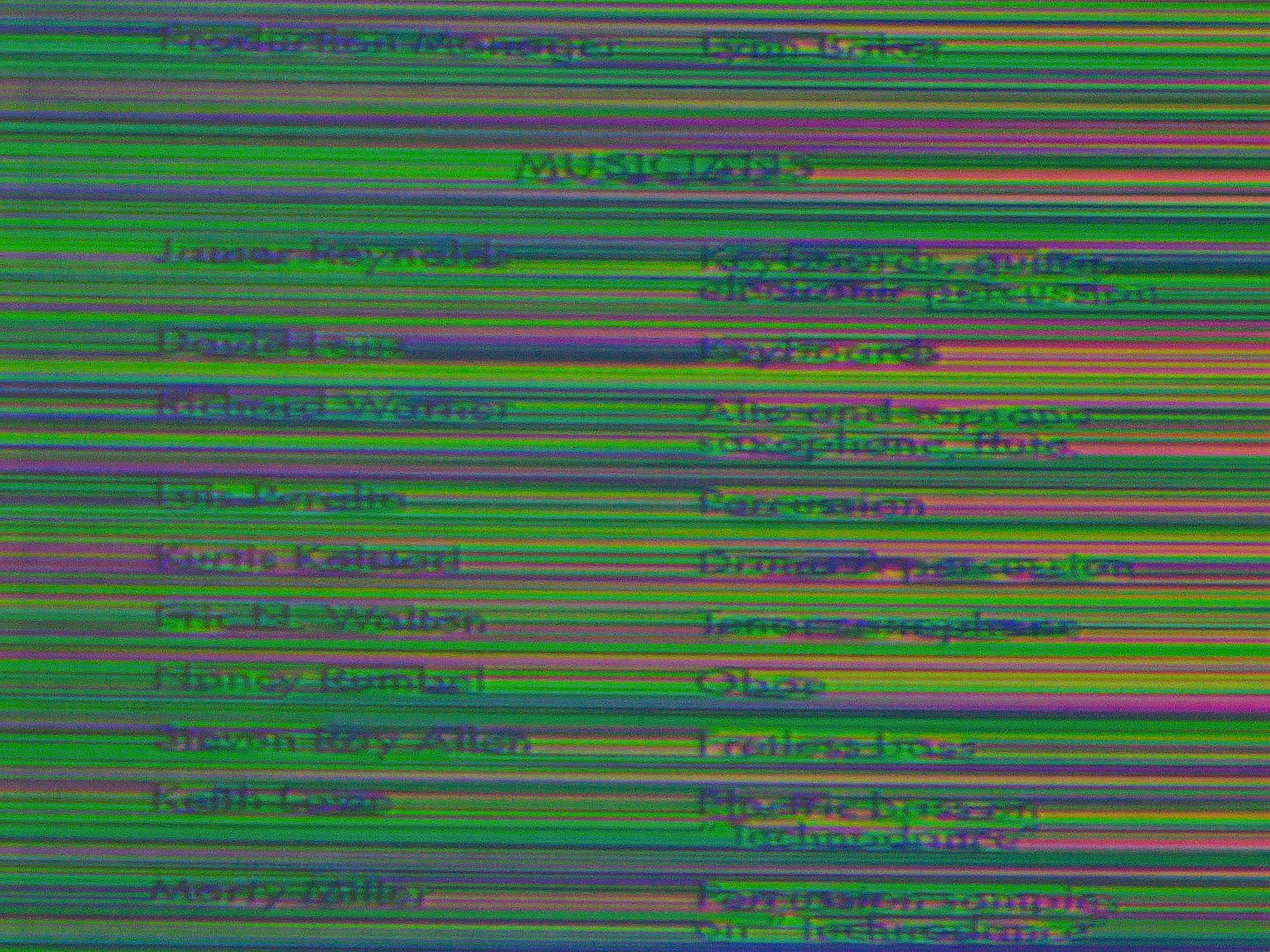
200× light micrograph of a LaserDisc copy of The Mind's Eye (1990), showing that the closing credits of the film are physically visible on the disc medium itself. Because on a CAV-formatted LaserDisc the adjacent tracks encode the same line in the NTSC video signal across different frames, and because the closing credits scroll vertically at a constant rate, the signal produces a coherent image on the disc.

Gramophone records have always used CAV, including CEDs which provide video signals.

Some high-speed CD and DVD drives can use CAV. It allows for shorter access times because the rotation speed (angular velocity) does not need to be changed when the laser seeks across the disc, similarly to the magnetic head of a hard disk drive. With a given angular (rotation) speed, the linear speed at the outermost track is nearly 2.4 times as fast as that of the innermost track.

CAV was used in the LaserDisc format for interactive titles; it was also used with special editions of certain films. CAV allowed for perfect still frames, as well as random access to any given frame on a disc. Playing time, however, was 30 minutes on each side (these discs are also known as "standard play"), as opposed to 60 minutes on each side for CLV-based discs ("extended play").

CAV is used with the Nintendo GameCube Game disc and Wii Optical disc, the original Xbox discs, and Sega's GD-ROM.

=== Partial constant angular velocity (P-CAV) ===
If the used media (e.g. DVD-RAM variants) has a linear (writing) speed limitation that can not be attained with physically supported angular (rotation) speeds at the inner edge of the recordable area, the disc writing can start off with a constant angular velocity, until the increasing linear velocity has reached the writing speed limitation of the disc.

At that point, the drive transitions into writing with a constant linear velocity.

== See also ==
- Constant linear velocity (CLV)
- Zone bit recording (ZCAV)
- Optical storage media writing and reading speed § Various optical disc formats writing/reading speeds
