= Video mode =

Video mode can mean:

- Operation mode used in DVD recorder to create DVD-Video compatible discs. See also VR Mode
- Operation mode in frame buffer display modes
- IBM PC compatible video display mode set by BIOS interrupt call INT 10H
