= Video recorder =

A video recorder may be any of several related devices:

- Digital video recorder (DVR); Personal video recorder (PVR)
- DVD recorder
- Videocassette recorder (VCR)
- Video tape recorder (VTR)
