= Phase-change Dual =

Rewritable optical disc standard

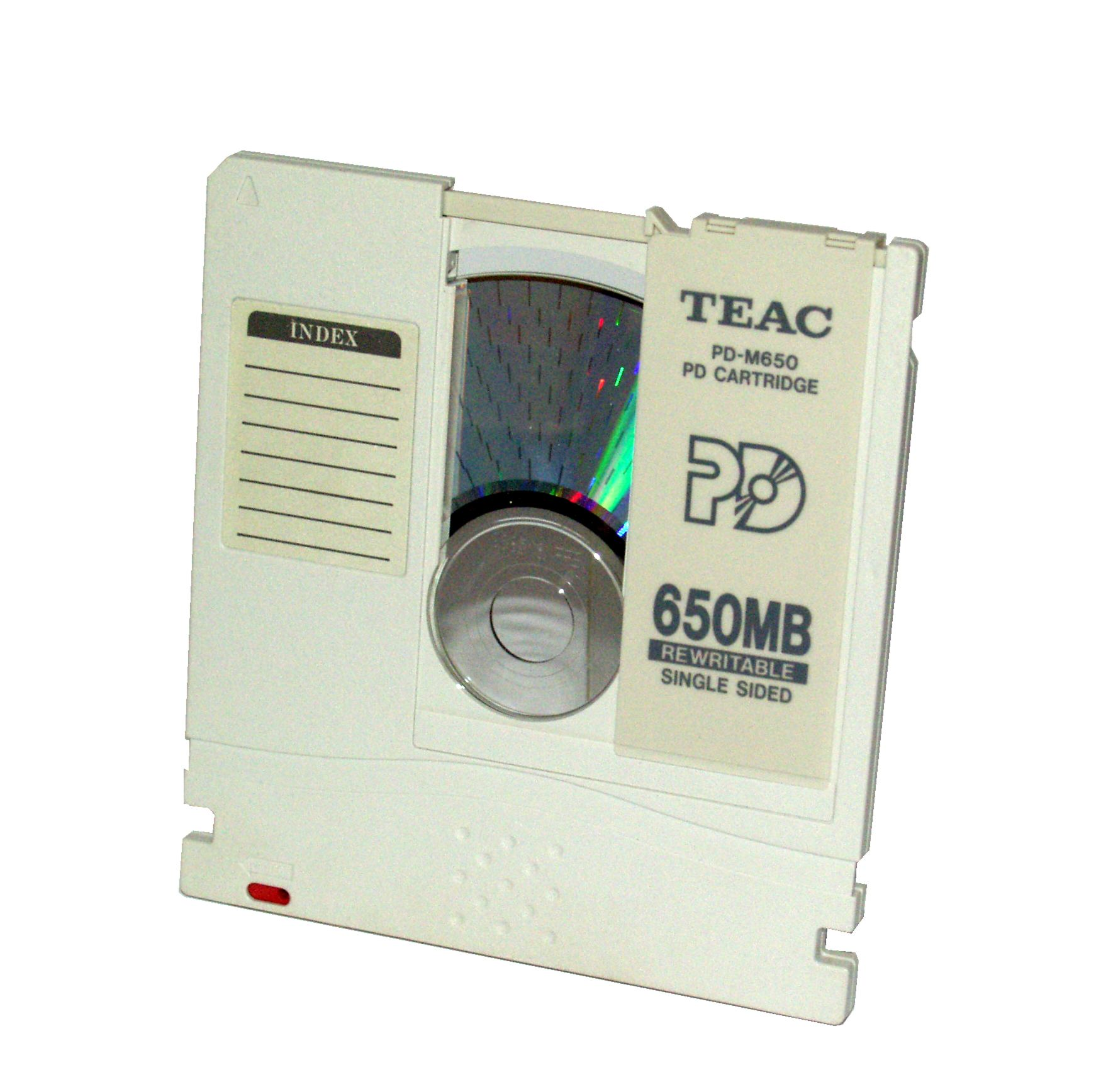
- PD-M650 media produced by Teac
- Media type: Optical disk
- Encoding: Digital signal
- Developed by: Matsushita
- Usage: Data storage
- Extended to: DVD-RAM

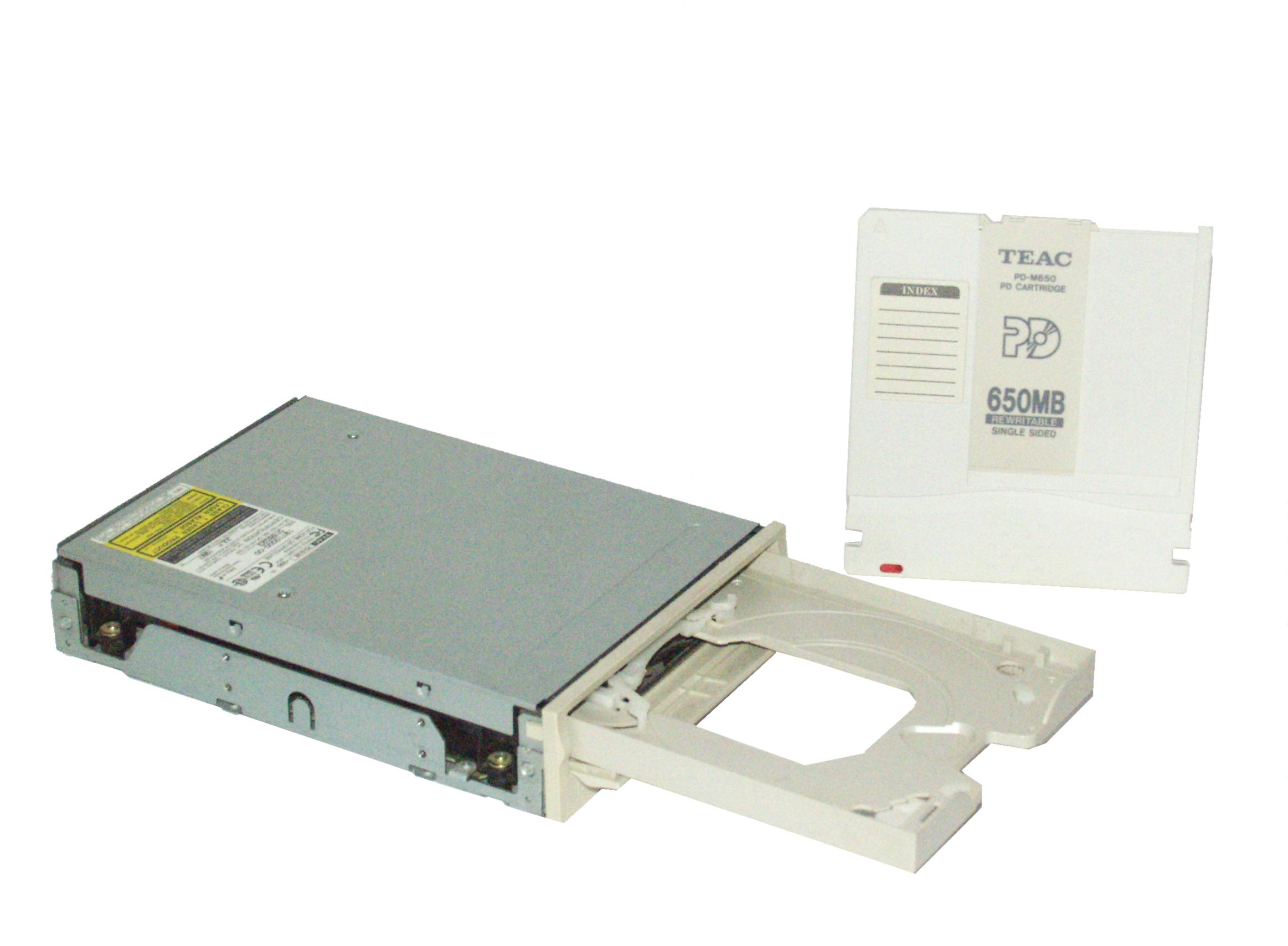
TEAC PD drive model PD-518E with PD media

Phase-change Dual (or Phase-change Disc, commonly abbreviated as PD) is a rewritable optical disc format and storage standard introduced by Matsushita Electric Industrial Co., Ltd. in April 1995.

The media offers a capacity of 650 MB on a single side. The discs are 120 mm (4.7 inches) in diameter, identical in size to a standard CD or DVD, and are permanently housed within a protective caddy. PD utilizes phase-change recording technology with a red laser and supports approximately 500,000 rewrite cycles.

Matsushita and other manufacturers produced both internal and external PD drives, which were marketed as a novel "dual function" system capable of reading standard CD-ROMs while also operating as a rewritable phase-change drive. In August 1996, Matsushita integrated the technology into its laptop line by releasing the PRONOTE PD, a notebook computer featuring a built-in drive that functioned as both a 650 MB storage device and a 4× CD-ROM reader.

== Technology ==
The underlying technology of the PD format relies on the phase-change properties of chalcogenide alloys, specifically a GeTe^{−}Sb_{2}Te^{−}_{3}Sb active layer. Chalcogenide compounds are particularly suited for this application because their chain-like bonding structures allow them to easily transition between crystalline and amorphous states.

Data is recorded and read based on the differences in optical properties between these two structural states. When the active layer is in its ordered, crystalline phase, it exhibits high optical reflectivity. To record data, the drive's red laser pulses at a high "write" power, heating targeted areas of the film above their melting point. As the laser moves away, the material cools extremely rapidly at a rate exceeding the critical cooling rate of 3.4 K/ns, quenching the liquid into a disordered, amorphous state. These amorphous marks have lower reflectivity, creating a readable contrast against the crystalline background.

To erase data, the laser operates at a medium "erase" power that heats the amorphous marks above their crystallization temperature but below the melting point. This localized heating allows the atomic structure to reorganize back into the highly reflective crystalline phase. Because the laser power can be modulated rapidly between the write and erase levels during a single pass, the PD format supports direct overwriting without requiring a separate erase cycle.

Managing the thermal dynamics of this process is critical. The PD disc utilizes a four-layer structure to control heat diffusion: a 155 nm bottom dielectric layer, a 24 nm phase-change active layer, a 45 nm upper dielectric layer, and a 100 nm aluminum-alloy reflection layer. The aluminum layer acts as a heat sink to ensure the rapid quenching necessary for forming amorphous marks, while the ZnS^{−}SiO_{2} dielectric layers protect the active layer and regulate the cooling rate. By optimizing the thickness and composition of these layers to decrease heat capacitance, developers were able to significantly improve the write sensitivity and extend the rewrite cycle capabilities of the media.

== Reception ==
As a rewritable medium, PD functioned much like a hard drive, allowing users to write and delete individual files on demand. This gave it a practical advantage over contemporary CD-R and early CD-RW formats, which were initially plagued by write failures and required specialized packet writing software. Furthermore, the caddy enclosure protected the disc's recording surface from dust and physical scratches, making it highly reliable.

During its commercial lifespan, PD competed directly with other removable storage formats such as magneto-optical (MO) drives, Iomega Zip, and SyQuest cartridges. However, the PD format offered the unique advantage of backward compatibility with standard CD-ROMs. In the mid-1990s, when CD-ROM drives were becoming essential yet many mainstream desktop computers only featured a single 5.25-inch drive bay, a single PD drive could efficiently serve as both the system's CD-ROM reader and a high-capacity removable storage drive.

The format was ultimately superseded by DVD-RAM, which launched in April 1997. Early 2.6 GB (version 1.0) DVD-RAM drives utilized a caddy design heavily derived from the PD format and maintained backward compatibility, allowing users to read and write legacy PD media. However, when the 4.7 GB (version 2.0) DVD-RAM standard was introduced in 2000, compatibility with PD was dropped. Subsequently, PD drives and media quickly disappeared from the consumer market.
