= Tres Hombres =

Studio album by ZZ Top
- Released: July 26, 1973
- Studios: Robin Hood (Tyler, Texas); Ardent (Memphis, Tennessee)
- Genres: Southern rock; blues rock; boogie rock; Texas blues
- Length: 33:26
- Label: London
- Producer: Bill Ham

ZZ Top chronology
Rio Grande Mud (1972)	Tres Hombres (1973)	Fandango! (1975)

Singles from Tres Hombres
- 1. "La Grange" Released: January 1974; 2. "Beer Drinkers & Hell Raisers" Released: 1974

Tres Hombres (Spanish for "three men") is the third studio album by the American rock band ZZ Top, released on July 26, 1973, by London Records. It was the band's first collaboration with engineer Terry Manning. The album was ZZ Top's commercial breakthrough in the United States, peaking at number 8 on the Billboard 200 chart in 1974. Lead single "La Grange" reached number 41 on the Billboard Hot 100. It was the first of many of the band's albums to incorporate the use of Spanish terminology in its branding.

== Recording and production ==
"La Grange"
An audio sample of "La Grange"

The track "Waitin' for the Bus" segues into "Jesus Just Left Chicago" almost seamlessly. Houston Chronicle entertainment writer Andrew Dansby wrote in 2013 that this fusing of the songs was not the original plan. Dansby claimed that the album's engineer was splicing tape and cut too much, leaving no gap between the songs. The album's engineer Terry Manning, who performed the edit, counter-claimed in a 2017 blog post that it was no accident. Manning admitted that although it was not planned, as an engineer he was "always looking very carefully at the timings between songs ... counting time, feeling how different time sigs go together, different keys, different feels". Manning wrote that he "tried several things to see how those two [songs] would go together" when it dawned on him that they could "come together as one song, exactly as if played that way." Manning wrote that when he initially presented the edit, Billy Gibbons loved it, while the album's producer Bill Ham was confused and wary of it. "[A]fter several plays," he wrote, "it was obvious (to) everyone that there was no other way they could ever exist again."

== Release ==
The album was released in July 1973. Frontman Billy Gibbons said in 2013:

We could tell that we had something special. The record became quite the turning point for us. The success was handwriting on the wall, because from that point we became honorary citizens of Memphis.

At the height of ZZ Top's success in the mid-1980s, a digitally remixed version of the recording was released on CD and the original 1973 mix was no longer issued. The remix version created controversy among fans because it significantly changed the sound of the instruments, especially drums. The remix version was used on all early CD copies and was the only version available for over 20 years. A remastered and expanded edition of the album was released on February 28, 2006, which contains three bonus live tracks. The 2006 edition is the first CD version to use Manning's original 1973 mix. Subsequent releases on digital platforms such as iTunes have used the original mix as well.

In addition to the standard 2-channel stereo version, a four-channel quadraphonic version was also released in 1973 in the Quad 8 8-track tape and Q4 Reel-to-reel tape formats.

The only international single released from the album in most countries was "La Grange" (backed with "Just Got Paid" from the band's second album Rio Grande Mud), which peaked at number 41 on the Billboard Hot 100 in June 1974. The song "Beer Drinkers & Hell Raisers" was released as a UK only single.

== Reception ==
Professional ratings
Review scores
Source	Rating
AllMusic	4.5/5 stars
The Daily Vault	B+
The Encyclopedia of Popular Music	4/5 stars
Pitchfork	9.0/10
The Rolling Stone Album Guide	3/5 stars

The album was released to a lukewarm reception by critic Steve Apple, who in a September 1973 review for Rolling Stone wrote that while the "Southern rock & roll sound" was becoming popular, ZZ Top themselves were "only one of several competent Southern rocking bands", though they had "an advantage over most white rockers" because they "sound black". He felt that ZZ Top had "the dynamic rhythms that only the finest of the three-piece bands can cook up. Billy Gibbons plays a tasty Duane Allman lead with Dusty Hill and Frank Beard pounding out the funky bottom", and were "one of the most inventive of the three-piece rockers" but wondered when "audiences will get tired of hearing the same ... 'Poot yawl hans together' patter." The album peaked at number 8 on the Billboard 200.

In 2000, the album was voted number 501 in Colin Larkin's All Time Top 1000 Albums. In 2003, it was ranked number 498 on Rolling Stone magazine's list of the 500 greatest albums of all time, and in 2012 ranked at number 490 on a revised list. In 2011 Houston Press named it the best boogie rock album ever in its list of "Five Essential Boogie-Rock Albums". In July 2013, 40 years after its release, the album was described by Andrew Dansby in the Houston Chronicle as "... full of characters and doings so steeped in caricature – yet presented straight-faced – as to invite skepticism. The album is stuffed with color and flavor, much like its famous gate-fold photo on the inside: a gut-busting couple of plates of food from the much-beloved but now-closed Leo's Mexican Restaurant on South Shepherd near Westheimer." AllMusic commented that "Tres Hombres is the record that brought ZZ Top their first top ten record, making them stars in the process. It couldn't have happened to a better record", and rated it 4.5 out of 5 stars. Andy Beta of Pitchfork awarded the album 9.0 out of 10, writing in 2017 that, "ZZ Top's 1973 breakthrough was a masterful melding of complementary styles, cramming Southern rock and blues boogie through the band's own idiosyncratic filter."

== Track listing ==
Side one
No.	Title	Writer(s)	Length
1.	"Waitin' for the Bus"	Billy Gibbons; Dusty Hill	2:59
2.	"Jesus Just Left Chicago"	Gibbons; Hill; Frank Beard	3:29
3.	"Beer Drinkers & Hell Raisers"	Gibbons; Hill; Beard	3:23
4.	"Master of Sparks"	Gibbons	3:33
5.	"Hot, Blue and Righteous"	Gibbons	3:14

Side two
No.	Title	Writer(s)	Length
1.	"Move Me on Down the Line"	Gibbons; Hill	2:30
2.	"Precious and Grace"	Gibbons; Hill; Beard	3:09
3.	"La Grange"	Gibbons; Hill; Beard	3:51
4.	"Sheik"	Gibbons; Hill	4:04
5.	"Have You Heard?"	Gibbons; Hill	3:14

2006 remaster bonus tracks
No.	Title	Writer(s)	Length
11.	"Waitin' for the Bus" (live)	Gibbons; Hill	2:42
12.	"Jesus Just Left Chicago" (live)	Gibbons; Hill; Beard	4:03
13.	"La Grange" (live)	Gibbons; Hill; Beard	4:44

== Personnel ==
ZZ Top

- Billy Gibbons – guitar, vocals (lead on all tracks), harmonica on "Waitin' for the Bus"
- Dusty Hill – bass, vocals (co-lead on "Beer Drinkers & Hell Raisers")
- Frank Beard – drums, percussion (credited as "Rube Beard")

Production

- Bill Ham – production
- Robin Brians – engineering (Robin Hood Studios)
- Terry Manning – engineering, mixing, editing (Ardent Studios)
- Bill Narum – album cover design
- Galen Scott – photography

== Charts ==
Chart (1974)	Peak position
Australian Albums (Kent Music Report)	36
Canada Top Albums/CDs (RPM)	13
US Billboard 200	8

== Certifications ==
Region	Certification	Certified units/sales
Canada (Music Canada)	Gold	50,000^{^}
United States (RIAA)	Gold	500,000^{^}
^{^} Shipments figures based on certification alone.
