= DVD R =

DVD R may refer to:

- DVD+R
- DVD-R

== See also ==
- DVD-RAM
- DVD recordable
