= Disk cartridge =

Disk cartridge or Optical disk cartridge may refer to:

- A 1960s computer disk pack which has a single hard disk platter encased in a protective plastic shell
- Removable disk storage media
- Zip disk
- A 3 1/2-inch Floppy disk
- An optical disc or magneto-optical disc enclosed in a protective plastic sheath called a Caddy (hardware)
- Ultra Density Optical
- Universal Media Disc
- Disk enclosure
- ROM cartridge
