= Master of Sparks =

Song by ZZ Top

from the album Tres Hombres
- Released: July 26, 1973
- Recorded: Brian Studios & Ardent Studios; Memphis, Tennessee
- Genre: Hard rock
- Length: 3:33
- Label: London
- Songwriter: Billy Gibbons
- Producer: Bill Ham

"Master of Sparks" is a song by American rock band ZZ Top from their 1973 album Tres Hombres.

== Background ==
The song tells the true story of Billy Gibbons and his friend R.K. Bullock who with a workman, welded together a steel ball cage with a seat and seatbelt fitted inside. They placed the cage into the bed of a truck and at night, after reaching a speed of 60 miles per hour (97 km/h), on Highway 6 near Houston, rolled the cage out the back with the hapless narrator and friend taking a ride inside. The cage generated a tail of sparks on the road but in its crushed condition stopped rolling. Still moving at high speed, the now egg shaped cage crashed into a fence. Both occupants survived relatively unscathed and were awarded the title "Master of Sparks" by the cheering crowd.

== Personnel ==
- Billy Gibbons – guitar, vocals
- Dusty Hill – bass
- Frank Beard – drums
