= DVD-VR =

Video format standard for DVD-R, DVD-RW, and DVD-RAM media

The DVD-VR standard defines a logical format for video recording on DVD-R, DVD-RW, and DVD-RAM style media, including the dual layer versions of these media. As opposed to media recorded with the DVD+VR recording standard, the resulting media are not DVD-Video compliant, and do not play back in some DVD-Video players. Most DVD video recorders in the market that support DVD-R, DVD-RW, or DVD-RAM media record to these media in DVD-VR mode, as well as in a DVD-Video compliant mode. It is possible to use the DVD-VR format with DVD+R and DVD+RW media, but no examples are known other than some PC based recording utilities.

The standard was introduced in 1999 by the DVD Forum, and licensing is managed by the DVD Format/Logo Licensing Corporation. For each of the supported media, the full recording standard consists of three parts being: Physical Specifications (Part 1), File System Specifications (Part 2), and the Video Recording Specifications (Part 3).

== Feature overview ==
The DVD-VR specification allows implementing the following main features:

- Video recording to DVD-R, DVD-RW, and DVD-RAM. Newer versions of the standard have been extended to also allow recording to DVD-R Dual Layer media.
- Up to 99 titles per disc.
- Multiple play lists defining different playback-paths of the recorded content.
- Adding chapters and bookmarks to a recording.
- Support Main/Sub language for recording bilingual broadcasting.
- Frame-accurate editing of recorded content: Title split, title delete, partial title delete.
- Fragmented recording: All unused space on the disc may be randomly added to new recordings. This is the opposite of the tape-model used by DVD+VR recorders.
- Video and data files (such as digital pictures, or MP3 files) may be mixed on a single disc.
- Multiple recording modes, up to 10.08 megabit per second (DVD-Video quality).
- Title and disc protection.
- 16:9 and 4:3 material may be mixed within a single file with the display switching correctly (where supported).

DVD-VR recorded media are not DVD-Video compliant, and do not play back in all DVD players. Some more recent DVD players, and also the Sony PlayStation 2, can play discs recorded in the DVD-VR format.

== Technical format overview ==
The DVD-VR standard defines a logical format for recording and editing of video on a DVD disc. Instead of modifying the DVD-Video standard, a separate standard was created to allow for this.

Video is recorded as an MPEG program stream. Video resolution depends on the recording quality and the video format used. Multiple audio encodings are allowed including MPEG Audio, Dolby Digital (AC-3) and linear PCM.

=== Directory and file structure ===
==== VRO file format ====
A DVD-VR recorded disc contains a 'DVD_RTAV' directory in the root of the filesystem, in which a single 'VR_MOVIE.VRO' file exists, containing the raw audio and video data for all video recordings on the disc. The recording metadata along with navigation data to represent playlist, programs, and so on are also stored in the 'VR_MANGR.IFO' file in the same directory. A backup copy of this file (VR_MANGR.BUP) typically is present as well to provide data redundancy.

Unlike standard DVD-Video recordings, the aspect ratio (4:3 or 16:9) is contained in the .VRO file itself as part of the video stream. Thus DVD-VR supports mixed format presentations within a single .VRO file. Contrast DVD-Video where the aspect ratio is coded into the accompanying .IFO file and thus a single .VOB file can be in a single aspect ratio only.

VRO is a container format for multiplexed audiovisual content. VRO file is an equivalent to a collection of DVD-Video VOB files. If one does not care about edits (e.g., deleting recorded videos), one can play the VRO directly as if it were a standard DVD-Video VOB file. Fragmented VRO files are not widely supported by software players and video editing software.

==== File system ====
The file system used on the media is UDF Revision 2.0.

Packet writing technology is used to allow random access to, and incremental updating of the optical media.

== See also ==
- DVD+VR
- VR Mode
- VOB
- DVD formats
- Universal Disk Format
- DVD-RW, DVD-R, DVD-RAM, and DVD-R9
