= Finalizing =

Finalizing (also spelled finalising) an optical disc is the process of writing out support data such as DVD menus, directory data, and the like to an optical disc in order to make it playable on a system other than the one it was recorded on. As a general rule, finalization means that the disc cannot have any additional data written to it. It is the last step in the DVD authoring process.

The term is also used as an alternative word for the "closing" of a CD-R, in which Table of Contents data and the like are written out to enable the computer to read a CD. Like DVD finalization, a closed CD-R cannot receive any additional data.

Some recording formats, such as DVD+VR, do not require finalization before they can be played.
