= Superbit =

Brand of high-bitrate DVDs

Superbit was a brand of premium DVD-Video versions of motion pictures from Sony Pictures Home Entertainment, a division of Sony Pictures Entertainment. Superbit DVDs aimed to improve picture quality over a standard DVD edition of a feature by increasing the bit rate of the encoded video. Audio quality was also improved by the mandatory inclusion of both Dolby Digital and DTS 5.1 surround audio tracks.

== Design ==
Superbit discs can be read by all regular DVD video players, but their film files were encoded at a bit rate that is, according to Sony, approximately 1.5 times higher (6-7 Mbit/s) than standard DVDs (4-5 Mbit/s), which helps minimize artifacts caused by video compression and allow the image to be pre-filtered less prior to compression, which results in more detail.

To maximize space for the main feature, static menus are used and commentary tracks are removed. To further improve the size and therefore quality of the film on the disc, Superbit discs contained a reduced amount (and usually completely devoid) of bonus materials, such as documentaries or interviews, which can be found on regular DVDs. All Superbit releases present the film in its original theatrical aspect ratio. Foreign dubs are also omitted and only subtitles in other languages besides the original English audio are offered for non-English-speaking consumers.

In addition to maximizing the bitrate for improved audio and video, the Superbit line introduced seamless layer changes. Prior to this line of Sony DVDs, all dual layer DVDs caused a slight pause during playback when the layer change occurred. Some standard DVDs had their layer changes placed in scenes where they were almost imperceptible. Superbit DVD were the only optical media discs produced that had true seamless layer changes until Blu-ray was introduced.

== History ==
The Superbit line launched in October 2001 with five titles: The Fifth Element, Crouching Tiger, Hidden Dragon, Air Force One, Desperado and Johnny Mnemonic. Following the initial release of the Superbit line, Superbit Deluxe was introduced, which bundled a Superbit-quality feature with a second disc containing the special features. In January 2007, Sony Pictures Home Entertainment discontinued its Superbit line in order to promote its Blu-ray Disc format.

Some of the most popular Superbit releases were the Sam Raimi films Spider-Man and Spider-Man 2. The multi-disc Superbit titles (meaning the films spanning more than one disc) included Das Boot as well as David Lean’s Lawrence of Arabia, but in order to maximize the bitrate for AV-quality the title was not split where enthusiasts were expecting: the intermission interlude. This led many fans of the film to ignore the release. Lawrence of Arabia was also limited to a single movie disc in many regions when the Blu-ray debuted with Sony’s Blu-ray version of Superbit ‘Mastered in 4K’ line. Only Japan got a ‘Mastered in 4K’ where the film spanned multiple discs with the disc split finally occurring at the more appropriate intermission interlude. The UHD Blu-ray of Lawrence was split across two triple layer BD100s at the appropriate spot again when debuting on that format with the Columbia Classics VoI. 1 UHD Blu-ray box set.
