= VR mode =

VR mode or Video Recording mode is a feature on stand-alone consumer and computer DVD recorders that allows video recording and editing on a DVD rewritable disc.

In VR mode, users can create and rename titles for the scenes. Also, if a scene is deleted, the space allocated by it will be utilized later without the need of reformatting a disc.

If the user would like to record on the same disc again at a later time, in VR mode, users may eject the disc and it will not be finalized by the recorder until it is manually initiated. For the sake of comparison, any DVD recorded in VR's competitor V mode (or Video mode) will be automatically finalized before it is ejected by the recorder. Disc finalization is still required if the disc formatted for VR mode will be played in another DVD player.

Currently, users can only record in VR mode with the use of DVD-RW, DVD-RAM and DVD+RW discs, (updated in 2000 to accommodate DVD-R (General)) [DVD players marked “RW compatible” and “DVD Multi” can play DVD-VR recorded discs] and on some recorders, also on hard-disk drives.

Blu-ray Disc and HD DVD also support VR mode-like features.

== DVD-VR & DVD+VR ==
There are two quite different application formats commonly known as VR mode.
1) DVD-VR was established by the DVD Forum and can be found on DVD-RW and DVD-RAM
2) DVD+VR is the creation and responsibility of Philips Electronics and is seen on their DVD+RW recorders.

=== DVD-VR ===
The DVD-VR recording mode offers advanced editing (including Non Linear Editing (NLE)), but is not compatible with DVD-Video. Recorders do not edit the video data stream directly. Editing is achieved by creating a 'playlist' which references segments of the recorded video data stream and compile the playlist by chapters of the video stream or can access the video stream directly by time reference. Recorders generally employ one method or the other, but rarely both. DVD-VR can also be used with DVD+RW media, but recorders rarely do so.

=== DVD+VR ===
The DVD+VR recording mode (a.k.a. +VR functionality) is compatible with DVD-Video (normal DVD-Video players), but offers basic editing like partial overwriting, title dividing, chapter marker placement, replace the menu screens, etc. This can be accomplished easily on DVD+R media. DVD+VR can theoretically be used with DVD-RW media, but partial overwriting and replacement of menus cannot be so easily accomplished due to limitations of the media. In order to achieve this, it would be necessary for the recorder to read and store the entire contents of the disc, erase it and then rewrite it. For this reason alone, DVD+VR is rarely used with DVD-RW (or DVD-R) media.

== See also ==
- DVD
- Blu-ray Disc
- HD DVD
- DVD+VR
- DVD-VR
