= Waitin' for the Bus / Jesus Just Left Chicago =

Song by ZZ Top

from the album Tres Hombres
- Released: July 26, 1973
- Studio: Brian Studios & Ardent Studios; Memphis, Tennessee
- Genre: Blues rock; hard rock
- Length: 2:53 / 3:30
- Label: London
- Songwriters: Billy Gibbons, Dusty Hill; Frank Beard (only "Jesus Just Left Chicago")
- Producer: Bill Ham

Official audio
- "Jesus Just Left Chicago" (2006 Remaster) on YouTube

"Waitin' for the Bus" and "Jesus Just Left Chicago" are two songs by American rock band ZZ Top from their third studio album, Tres Hombres (1973). The two songs open the album, segued into each other. For years radio stations played the two tracks together. "Waitin' for the Bus" was written solely by Billy Gibbons and Dusty Hill, while "Jesus Just Left Chicago" was also co-written by drummer Frank Beard.

== "Waitin' for the Bus" ==
"Waitin' for the Bus" is the opening track on the album. In a 1985 interview with Spin magazine, ZZ Top bass player Dusty Hill said: "I've always liked that song. It's a working man's song. It's been a couple of years, but I went to Austin from Houston and I decided, hell, I'll ride the bus. I hadn't done it in a long time. And you can meet some very unique people on a bus and in a bus station. I like to people watch. I love bus stations and train stations. The thing about a bus is who you have to sit beside. If the guy's got good wine, it's OK." The song is the band's fourth most played song, right behind "La Grange", "Tush" and its sequel song "Jesus Just Left Chicago".

== "Jesus Just Left Chicago" ==
Also alluded to as "Jesus Done Left Chicago", in an interview with Jeb Wright of Classic Rock Revisited, lead guitarist Billy Gibbons explained: "The two songs "Waitin' for the Bus" and "Jesus Just Left Chicago" were written separately during sessions that were not too far apart. We were in the process of compiling the tracks for the album Tres Hombres, and that segue was a fortunate miscalculation by the engineer. He had been attempting to splice out some blank tape, and the result is that the two come off as a single work. It just seemed to work."

The Deep South is noted for its Christian roots, and in spite of the hostile reception rock 'n' roll received from the Bible Belt (and America generally) when it first reared its head, many contemporary musicians began their musical careers in or around the church. The most famous white rock 'n' roller from the Deep South to combine the two was of course Elvis Presley, who recorded the odd religious song. "Jesus Just Left Chicago" has a spiritual dimension, and is written in the style of Black Christian music, adhering to a strict blues format.

According to Billy Gibbons, he got the idea for this song when he was a teenager. He was talking on the phone to a friend who was known as "R&B Jr" who had lots of strange sayings in his lexicon. One day Billy was talking to him on the phone when he blurted out "Jesus Just Left Chicago!". Gibbons also explained: "We took what could have been an easy 12-bar blues and made it more interesting by adding those odd extra measures. It's the same chords as "La Grange" with the Robert Johnson lick, but weirder." Being next to "La Grange" and "Tush", and right before "Waitin' for the Bus", "Jesus Just Left Chicago" is the band's third most played concert song.

== Other releases ==
The songs were included on compilation albums such as Chrome, Smoke & BBQ (2003), Rancho Texicano (2004) and The Very Baddest (2014). Live versions are included on the 2019 compilation album Goin' 50.

== Reviews and popularity ==
Despite not being released as singles, the songs are widely considered as two of the band's essential songs. Rolling Stone includes the songs in the top 10 of ZZ Top's essential songs. Ultimate Classic Rock ranks the couple of songs as ZZ Top's fourth best song, while WRIF ranks them eighth.
