= DVD recorder =

Optical disk technology

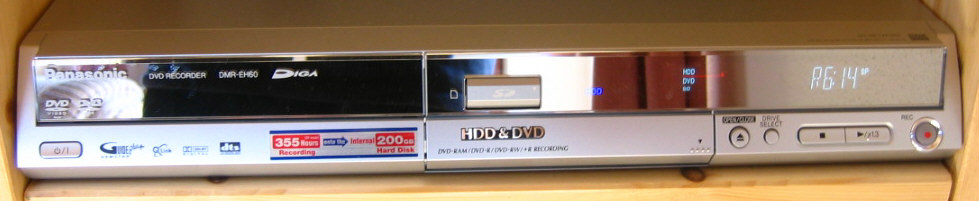
DVR with built-in DVD recorder

A DVD recorder is an optical disc recorder that uses optical disc recording technologies to digitally record analog or digital signals onto blank writable DVD media. Such devices are available as either installable drives for computers or as standalone components for use in television studios or home theater systems.

As of March 1, 2007, all new tuner-equipped television devices manufactured or imported in the United States must include an ATSC tuner. The US Federal Communications Commission (FCC) has interpreted this rule broadly, including apparatus such as computers with TV tuner cards with video capture ability, videocassette recorders and standalone DVD recorders. NTSC DVD recorders are undergoing a transformation, either adding a digital ATSC tuner or removing over-the-air broadcast television tuner capability entirely. However, these DVD recorders can still record analog audio and analog video.

Standalone DVD recorders, alongside Blu-ray recorders, have been relatively scarce in the United States due largely to "restrictions on video recording" and piracy concerns.

The first DVD recorders appeared on the market in 1999–2000.

== Technical information ==
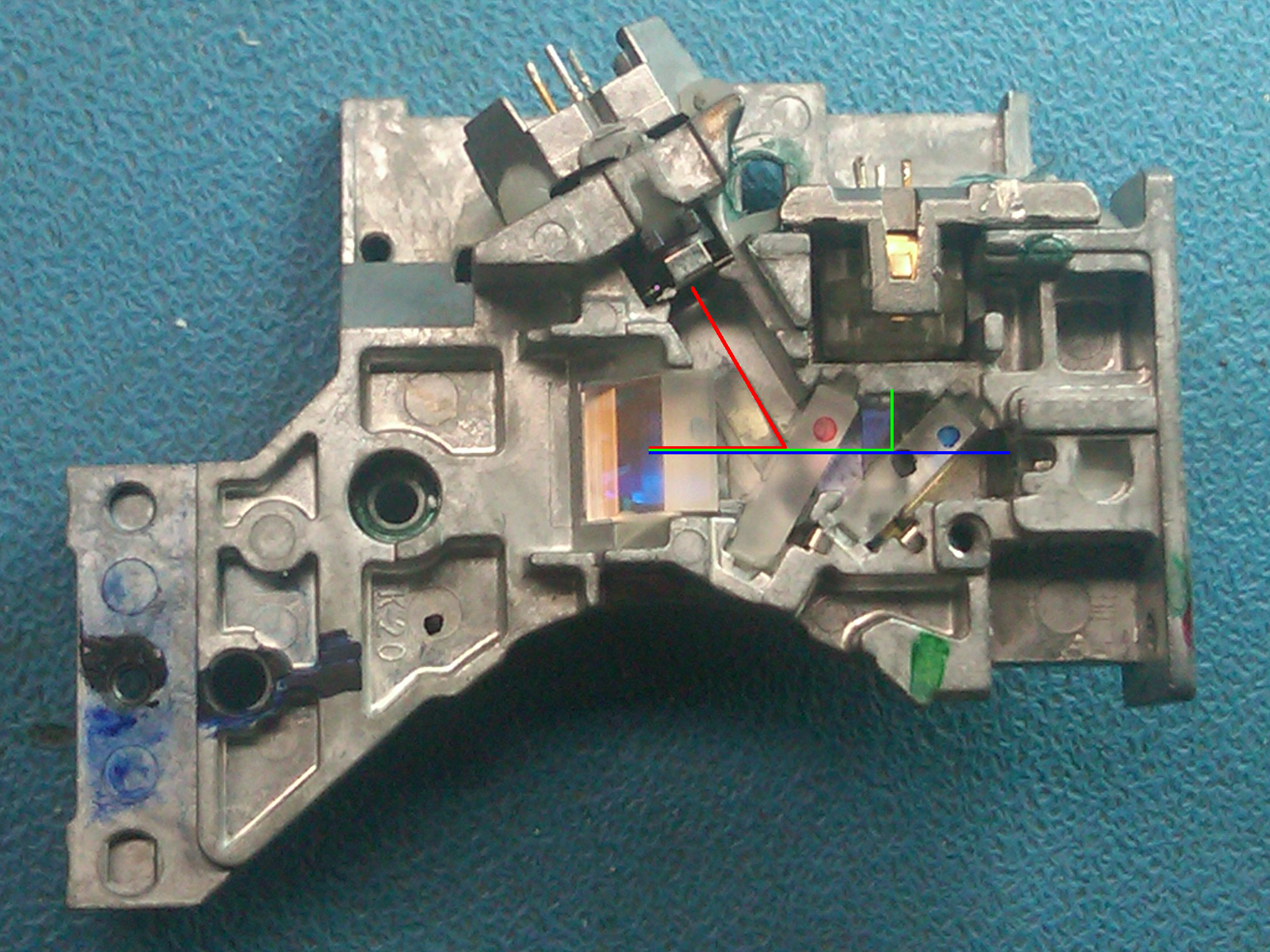
DVD-RW optics

Originally, DVD recorders supported one of three standards: DVD-RAM, DVD-RW (using DVD-VR), and DVD+RW (using DVD+VR), none of which are directly compatible. Most current DVD drives support both the + and - standards, while few support the DVD-RAM standard, which is not directly compatible with standard DVD drives.

Recording speed is generally denoted in values of X (similar to CD-ROM usage), where 1X in DVD usage is equal to 1.321 MB/s, roughly equivalent to a 9X CD-ROM. In practice, this is largely confined to computer-based DVD recorders, since standalone units generally record in real time, that is, 1X speed.

Recorders use a laser (usually 650 nm red) to read and write DVDs. The reading laser is usually not stronger than 5 mW, while the writing laser is considerably more powerful. The faster the writing speed is rated, the stronger the laser. DVD burner lasers often peak at about 100-400 mW in continuous wave (some are pulsed).

== Computer-based DVD (Digital Versatile Disc) drives ==
DVD recorder drives are standard equipment in many computer systems on the market, after being initially popularized by the Pioneer/Apple SuperDrive; aftermarket drives can cost as little as $20. DVD recorder drives can be used in conjunction with DVD authoring software to create DVDs near or equal to commercial quality, and are also widely used for data backup and exchange. As a general rule, computer-based DVD recorders can also handle CD-R and CD-RW media; in fact, a number of standalone DVD recorders use drives designed for computers.

More recently, manufacturers have begun to phase out DVD drives from laptop computers in favor of portability and digital media.

Most internal drives are designed with SATA interfaces, with parallel ATA becoming increasingly rare. External drives often use the USB standard for connectivity.

DVD recorder drives manufactured since January 2000 are required by the DVD consortium to respect DVD region codes when reading a disc. The drives are incapable of assigning region codes when writing a disc as this is stored on a part of the disc to which PC based and standalone video recorders do not have write access.

DVD duplication systems are generally built out of stacks of drives, connected through a computer-based backplane.

== Standalone DVD recorders ==
When the standalone DVD recorder first appeared on the Japanese consumer market in 1999, early units were very expensive, costing between $2500 and $4000 USD. More recently, DVD recorders from notable brands have dropped in price. Early units supported only DVD-RAM and DVD-R discs, but newer units can record to DVD-R, DVD-RW, DVD+R, DVD+RW, DVD-R DL and DVD+R DL. Certain models include mechanical hard disk drive-based digital video recorders (DVRs) to improve ease of use. Standalone DVD recorders generally have basic DVD authoring software built in.

In 2009, Panasonic introduced the world's first Blu-ray disc recorder which was capable of recording both DVDs and Blu-ray discs and featured built in satellite HDTV tuners. A year later, Panasonic introduced Blu-ray disc recorders with terrestrial HDTV tuners.

DVD recorders have technical advantages over VCRs, including:

- Superior video and audio quality
- Easy-to-handle smaller form-factor disc media, and higher durability compared to magnetic tape
- Random access to video chapters without rewinding or fast-forwarding (serial access)
- Onscreen multilingual subtitles and labeling not available on VCRs
- No playback wear and tear
- High-quality digital copying, with little or no generational quality loss
- Improved editing on rewritable media
- Playlisting
- No risk of accidentally recording over existing content or unexpectedly running out of space during recording
- Easily accessible recordings as a result of chapter menus

Note: Blu-ray disc recorders can record full high definition videos on BD-Rs and BD-REs.

Disadvantages include:

- Slow initial access/load times due to the optical nature of the disc
- Limited rewritability on DVD-RW/+RW discs (typically around 1000). DVD-RAM is better suited for high frequency re-recording (around 100,000 rewrites)
- Relatively short life of the laser diodes (average of about 2 years depending on usage).

In addition, DVDs recorded with DVD recorders in the standard DVD format must be finalized to view in other DVD players. This disadvantage does not apply to discs recorded in the newer and more flexible DVD-VR format or the DVD+VR format - the latter (but not the former) also being compatible with DVD players. The implementation of MPEG-2 compression used on most standalone DVD recorders is required to compress the picture data in real time, producing results that may not be up to par with professionally rendered DVD video, which can take days to compress.

Standard definition VCR replacement DVD video recorders typically has a set of standard recording modes for fitting 1, 2, 4, 6, 8, 10 hour modes (XP, SP, LP, EP, SLP, SEP, respectively) on single layer 12 cm discs (DVD5). These modes are comparable to those found on VHS VCRs using standard 120-tapes, having SP, LP, SLP modes of 2, 4, 6 hour.

The United States converted its over-the-air television broadcasts to digital "ATSC" in June 2009. This will have a limited impact in ending the need for DVD recorders to perform realtime MPEG-2 encoding or transcoding. The only setup where ATSC could eliminate MPEG-2 encoding/transcoding in a DVD recorder would be where an antenna is hooked directly into a DVD recorder that has an integrated ATSC tuner. However, the DVD recorder will have to transcode the ATSC MPEG-2 into DVD-Video-compliant MPEG-2 if the ATSC MPEG-2 stream isn't already DVD-Video-compatible. This would require transcoding for all high-definition broadcasts and some if not all standard-definition broadcasts. The same general situation applies to digital cable service; only DVD recorders with integrated digital cable ("QAM") tuners can avoid transcoding, and then only if the digital cable system is already sending a DVD-Video-compatible MPEG-2 stream, which again requires transcoding of all HD content and some if not all SD content. All other setups (digital cable box's analog outputs to DVD recorder, satellite box's analog outputs to DVD recorder, DVD recorder tuning and recording analog cable channels which are still permitted after 2/2009, etc.) usually always involve an analog step with MPEG-2 encoding being necessary inside the DVD recorder.

A number of manufacturers have combined DVD recorders with mechanical hard disk drive-based digital video recorders, allowing for recording to large fixed disks, and the ability to view these recordings off the hard disk at a later date.

In Japan, AVCREC recorders, which are able to record MPEG-2 or AVC high definition video from ISDB broadcast with or without re-encoding, get increasingly popular. Initially, AVCREC recorders use DVD recordable discs, but newer models are able to record onto Blu-ray discs as well onto hard disk drives.

=== ATSC standalone DVD recorders ===
As a result of the North American digital switchover, tuner-equipped devices manufactured or imported into the United States are now required by the US Federal Communications Commission to include digital tuners.

This has caused most new VHS recorders to be implemented as DVD/VCR combo units, or to be manufactured without tuners. The US requirement of ATSC compatibility forces inclusion of MPEG-2 decoding hardware, which is already part of all DVD players but which otherwise would be unnecessary in an analog-only VCR.

A tunerless recorder does not have RF coaxial connections and can only be used to record from an external device, such as a cable converter box with a composite video output.

An ATSC-capable DVD unit can also serve as a more-powerful alternative to digital television adapters, which allow DTV reception with older NTSC analog televisions. The DVD recorders offer additional capabilities, such as automated VCR-style timeshifting of programming and a variety of output formats, that are deliberately not included in the most common mass-market US ATSC converters.

Unlike the more common digital television adapter boxes, newer DVD recorder units are able to tune both analog and digital signals - an advantage when receiving low-power television and foreign (analogue) signals. Some, however, do suffer from many of the same design limitations as the less costly converter boxes, including poorly designed signal strength meters, incomplete display of broadcast program information, incompatibility with antenna rotators or CEA-909 smart antennas and inability to add digital channels without wiping out all existing channels and rescanning the entire band.

A DVD recording of an over-the-air HDTV broadcast is at DVD resolution, which is inferior to the original broadcast with 720p or 1080i resolution. Some units also provide limited USB or flash memory interface capability, often only supporting viewing of digital camera still photos or playback of MP3s with no ability to write video to these media.

A number of DVD recorders are also capable of recording to SVCD, VCD and Audio CD formats. Recording to DVDs can be done at different speeds that may take between 1 and 6 hours (even up to 8 hours on certain models) on a standard (single sided 12 cm) blank DVD. A trade off exists between recording time and video quality.

=== MiniDVD recorders ===
8 cm miniDVDs are used on some digital camcorders, primarily those meant for a consumer market ("point and shoot"); such discs are usually playable on a full-sized DVD player, but may not record on a full-sized DVD recorder system. Though popular for their convenience (in the manner of VHS-C), DVD camcorders are not suitable for professional use due to higher levels of compression compared to MiniDV and the difficulty of editing MPEG-2 video.

== See also ==
- Digital video
- Digital video recorder (DVR)
- DVD
- Optical disc recorder
- Videocassette recorder (VCR, video recorder)
- Video scaler "Upconverting"
