= TEAC Corporation =

Japanese electronics company

- Native name: ティアック株式会社
- Type: Public KK
- Traded as: TYO: 6803
- Industry: Electronics
- Founded: 29 August 1953; 73 years ago in Tokyo, Japan
- Headquarters: Ochiai, Tama-shi, Tokyo, 206-8530, Japan
- Key people: Yuji Hanabusa (President)
- Products: Peripheral equipment; Consumer and professional audio equipment; Information equipment
- Revenue: JPY 20.3 billion (FY 2014) (US$ 185 million) (FY 2014)
- Net income: JPY -1.8 billion (FY 2014) (US$ -16.6 million) (FY 2014)
- Number of employees: 1,046 (consolidated, as of 30 September 2015)
- Website: Official website

TEAC Corporation (ティアック株式会社, Tiakku Kabushiki-gaisha) (/ˈtiːæk/) is a Japanese electronics manufacturer. TEAC was created by the merger of the Tokyo Television Acoustic Company, founded in 1953, and the Tokyo Electro-Acoustic Company, founded in 1956.

== Overview ==
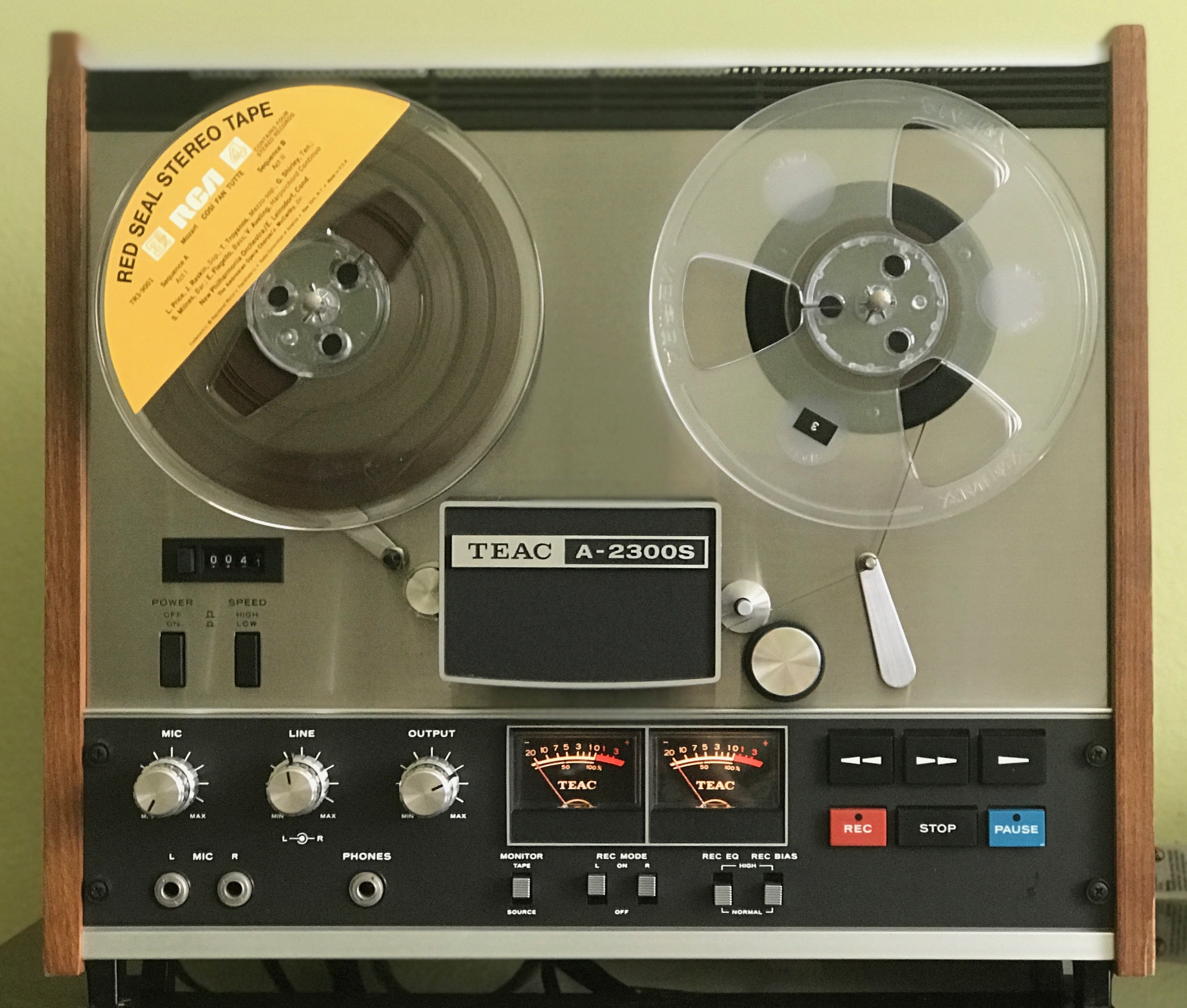
TEAC A-2300S reel-to-reel stereo recorder

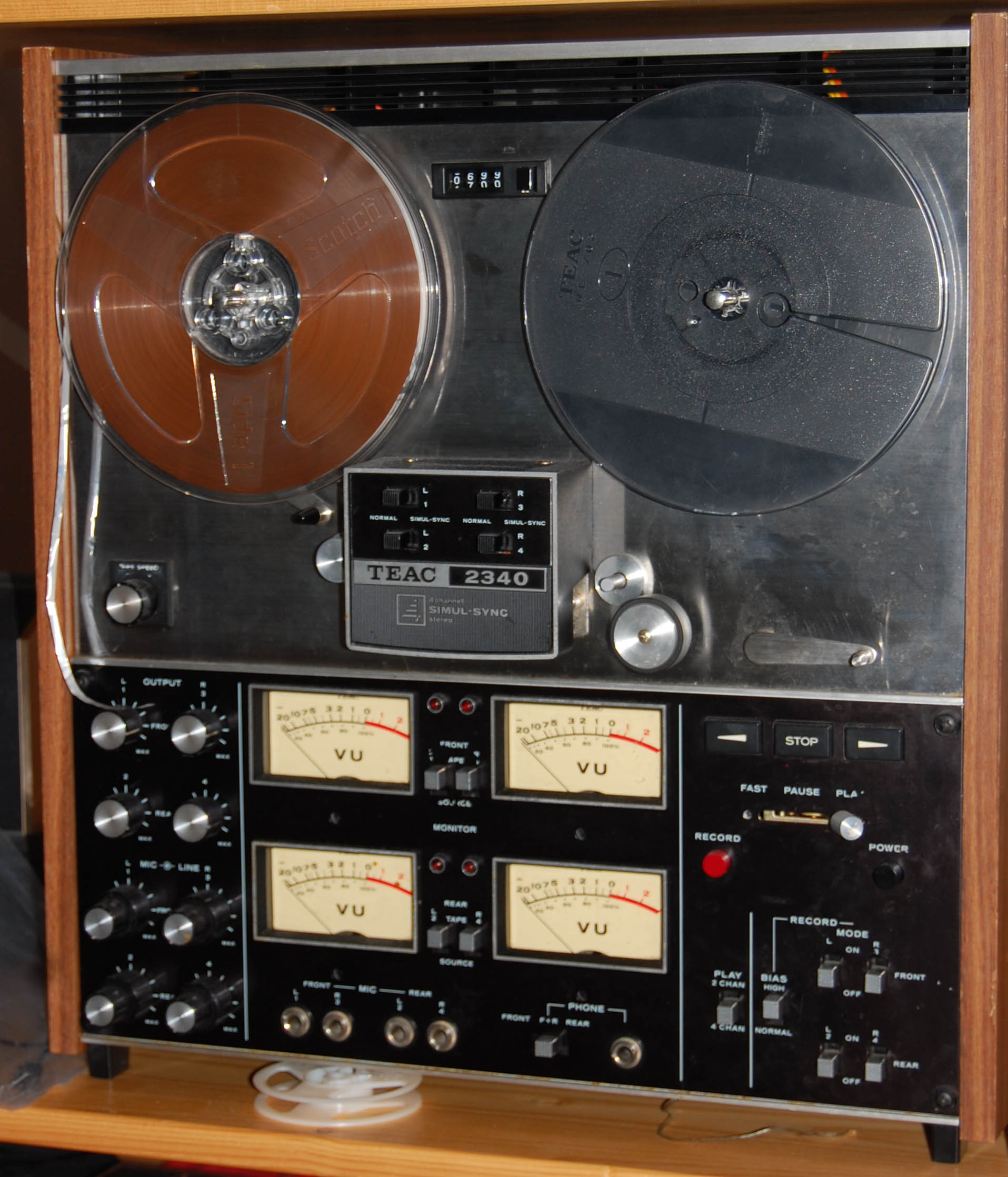
The TEAC 2340, a popular 1970s early home multitrack recorder, four tracks on ¼ inch tape

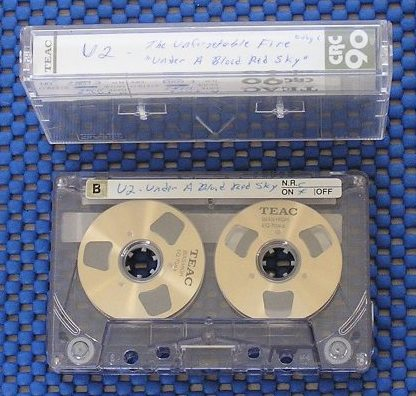
TEAC CRC 90 minute audio cassette. The tape reels resemble a reel-to-reel tape.

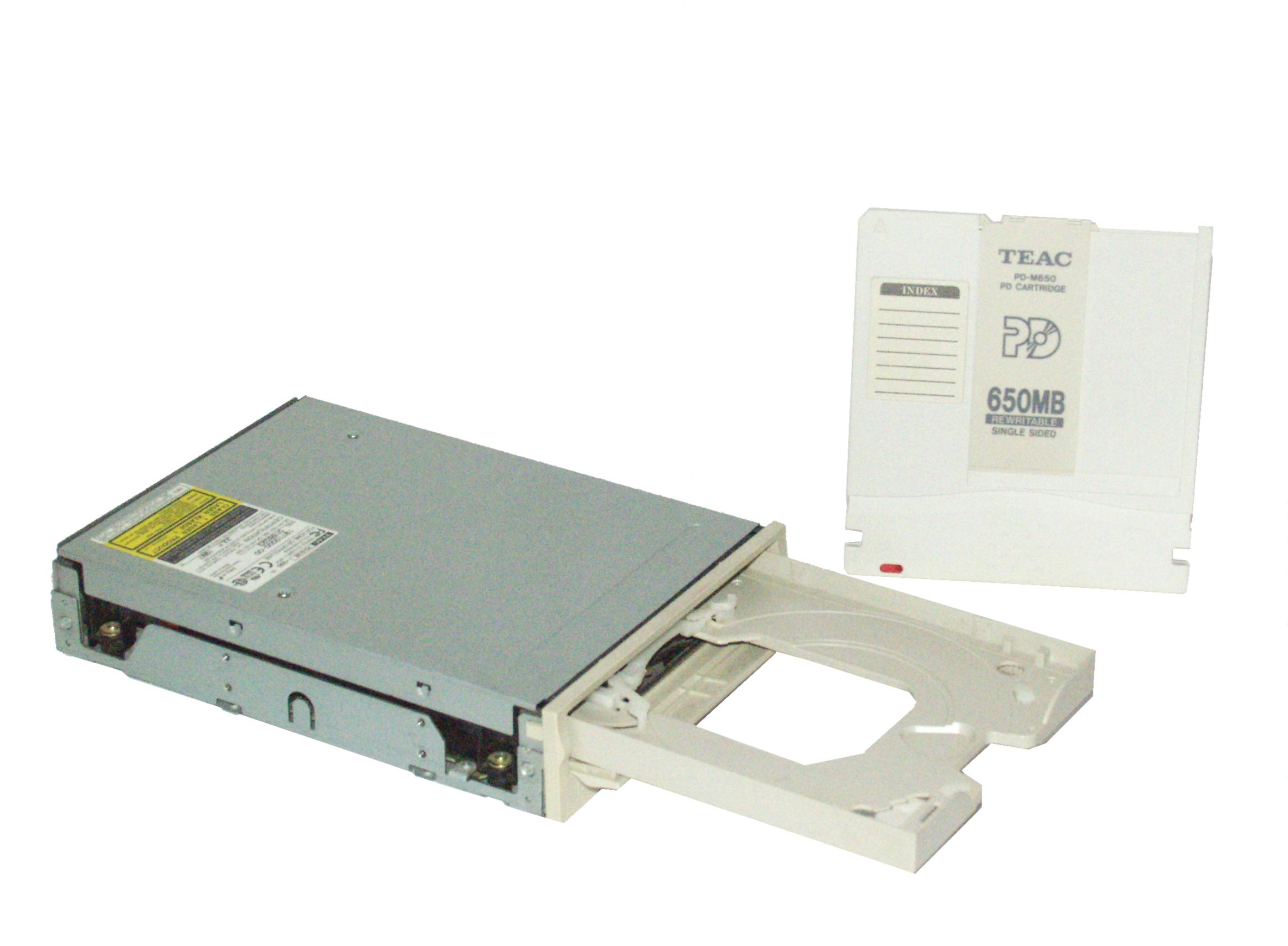
Phase-change Dual Drive TEAC PD-518E with medium TEAC PD-M650.

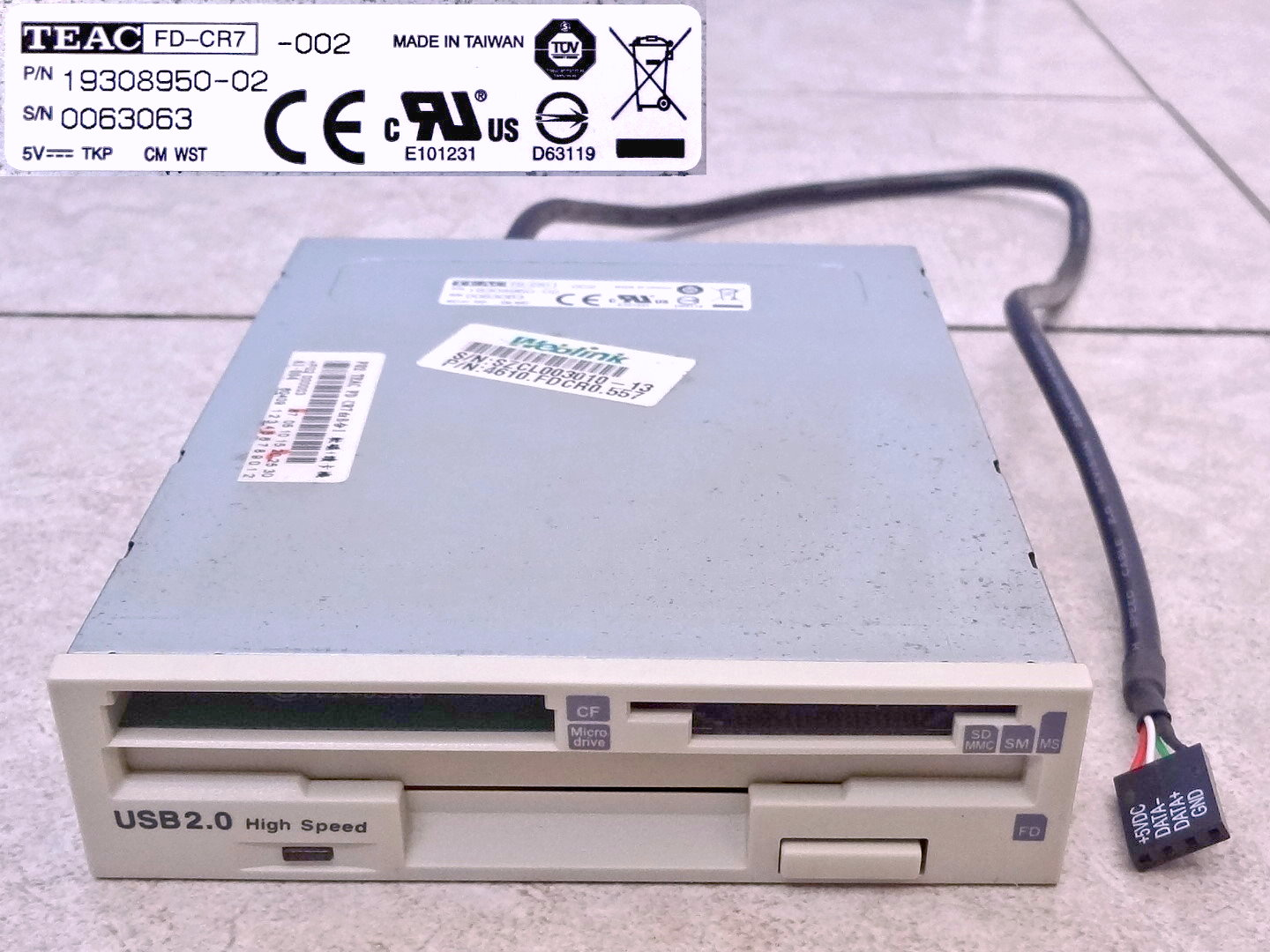
internal Floppy disk drive and memory card reader (USB)

TEAC is known for its audio equipment, and was a primary manufacturer of high-end audio equipment in the 1970s and 1980s and low-end audio during the 1990s. During that time, TEAC produced reel-to-reel machines, cassette decks, CD players, turntables and amplifiers.

TEAC produced an audio cassette with tape hubs that resembled reel-to-reel tape reels in appearance. Many manufacturers at the time used these TEAC cassettes in advertisements of their tape decks because the TEAC cassettes looked more professional than standard audio cassettes, and because reel-to-reel tape recordings were known to be of higher quality than cassette recordings.

== History ==
The company that eventually became the TEAC corporation was founded in August 1953. Originally named the Tokyo Television Acoustic Company, it employed Katsuma Tani, a former aviation and aeronautics engineer, who established a reputation as a highly qualified creator of audio equipment.

In 1956, his brother, Tomoma Tani, brought home a hand-made, 3-motor, 3-head stereo tape recorder. This sparked Katsuma's interest in reel-to-reel tape recorders. Confident they could engineer a better tape recorder, the Tani brothers founded the Tokyo Electro-Acoustic Company on 24 December 1956.

The Tokyo Television Acoustic Company and the Tokyo Electro-Acoustic Company were merged to create the TEAC corporation, taking the initials of the latter company as its name. The main focus of the new company was to design and manufacture tape recorders.

In 1969, TEAC produced the first consumer four-track reel-to-reel tape recorders capable of playing pre-recorded Quadraphonic open reel tapes (Q4). This was the first format to play high quality four-channel quadraphonic recordings in the home. In order to keep costs affordable, home machines used slower tape speeds and narrower track widths compared to similar professional machines. Quadraphonic sound was not widely adopted by the public and the Q4 format died by the late 1970s.

In 1972, TEAC introduced the first consumer grade four-track reel-to-reel recorders with Simul-Sync that were capable of overdubbing. Musicians were able to use these products as the basis of home recording studios. With this advancement many consumers created sophisticated home demo recordings for the first time. TEAC, and its TASCAM division, as well as other manufacturers sold thousands of these machines to musicians well into the 1990s.

Some of TEAC's most popular home multitrack recorders with Simul-Sync:

- The A3340 4-track recorder with 10.5" tape reels, 7½ and 15 ips speeds w/ manual direction toggle lever
- The A2340 4-track recorder with 7" tape reels, 3¾ and 7½ ips speeds w/ manual direction toggle lever
- The A3340S 4-track recorder with 10.5" tape reels, 7½ and 15 ips speeds, the 's' designation indicates an improved tape transport mechanism with solenoid control
- The A2340S 4-track recorder with 7" tape reels, 3¾ and 7½ ips speeds, the 's' designation indicates an improved tape transport mechanism with solenoid control

In 2013, Gibson bought a majority stake in the company, giving it 54.42% of the company. After Gibson's bankruptcy in 2018, TEAC announced that they would continue to operate on their own.

== Computer tape memory systems ==
In May 1961, TEAC entered into a licensing agreement with IBM to create magnetic tape memory systems.

== TEAC Australia ==
TEAC Australia was established in 1978 and licensed the TEAC brand name to distribute rebadged electronics manufactured by generic electronics manufacturers in China, or by companies such as GoldStar and Funai. These products were sold in discount department stores such as Kmart and had a reputation for being cheap and poor quality.
