= DVD-RAM =

Variant of DVD designed with random access in mind

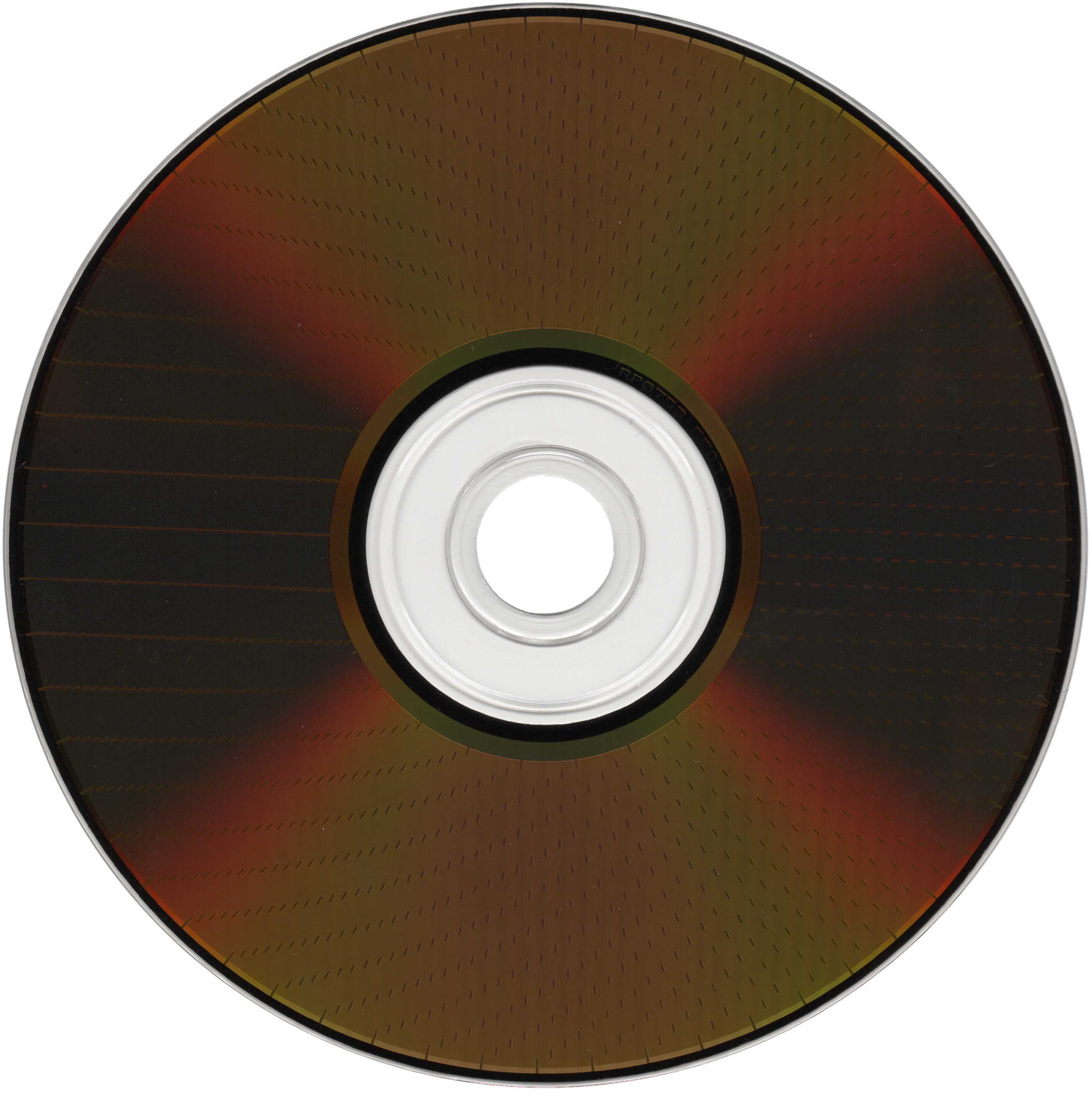
- Borders of the hard sectors are visible on the data side of a type 2 DVD-RAM disc.
- Media type: Optical disc
- Capacity: Version 1.0: 2.58 GB per side; Version 2.0: 4.7 GB per side; Version 2.1: 1.46 GB per side (8 cm; 3" discs)
- Block size: 2 KiB
- Read mechanism: 300–650 nm laser
- Write mechanism: 650 nm laser
- Dimensions: 12 cm (5"), 8 cm (3")
- Extended from: DVD, Phase-change Dual
- Released: 1996
- Discontinued: 2019

DVD-RAM (DVD Random Access Memory) is a DVD-based disc specification presented in 1996 by the DVD Forum, which specifies rewritable DVD-RAM media and the appropriate DVD writers. DVD-RAM media have been used in computers as well as camcorders and personal video recorders since 1998.

In May 2019, Panasonic, the only remaining manufacturer of DVD-RAM discs, announced that it would end production of DVD-RAM media by the end of that month, citing shrinking demand as the primary motivation. Panasonic made these discs under its own brand name and also under other brands such as Verbatim. Other manufacturer that produced DVD-RAM discs included Ritek and Maxell.

The "RAM" in its name is related to random-access memory that computers use as main memory, not in the technology but in sense that it can be used as a random-access memory unit rather than a sequential-access memory unit such as a magnetic tape drive.

== Format ==
DVD-RAM works by means of phase change technology which was chosen instead of magneto-optical technology (an already existing rewritable solution at the time) because it does not require a magnetic head and therefore it represented reduced complexity and costs. Phase change technology uses laser light to heat the surface of a phase changing alloy and allows it to go from a crystalline to an amorphous state and vice versa, therefore altering its optical reflectivity index. To change the recording material from a crystalline to an amorphous state, and back again a high or medium power laser light is used to control the rate of cooling of the phase changing alloy therefore establishing the final state. Encoding is done by means of difference in reflectivity of the alloy, a laser is pointed at the surface and the returned intensity signifies either a 1 or a 0.

DVD-RAM uses a continuous spiral track divided into hard (factory originated) sectors, in contrast to traditional spiral recording found in other DVD and CD formats. A 12 cm (5") 4.7 GB disc is divided into 35 zones of tracks, with each zone having more sectors per track compared to the previous zone. This makes its data structuring very similar to that of hard drives and floppy disks. This means that usually DVD-RAMs are suitable to be accessed by the OS without any special software

== Specification ==
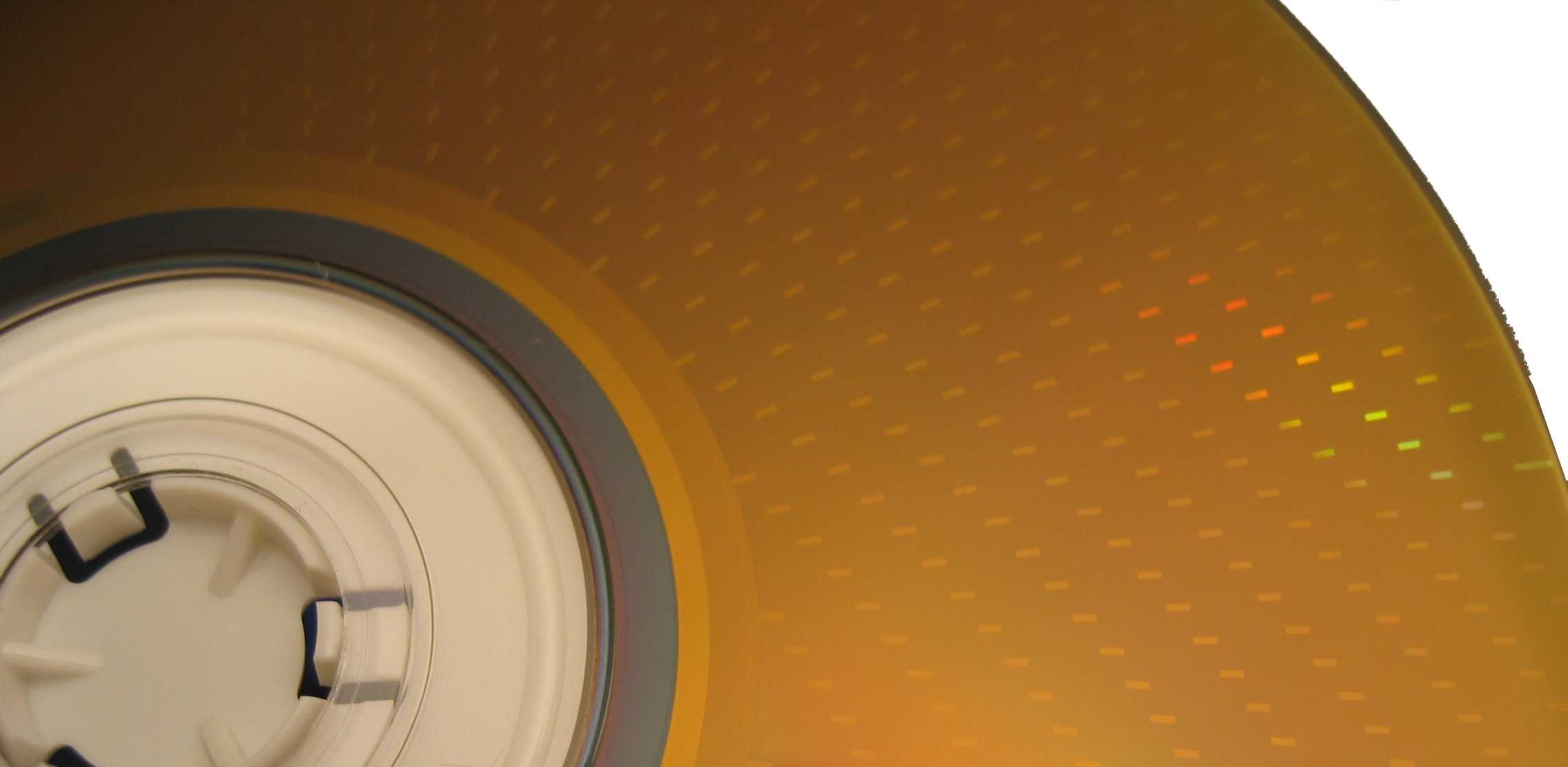
A DVD-RAM disc can be identified by many small rectangles distributed on the surface of the data carrier.

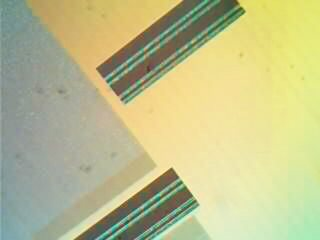
These rectangles constitute the hard (factory originated) sectoring of the DVD-RAM.

=== Recording speeds ===
Since the Internationale Funkausstellung Berlin 2003 the specification is being marketed by the RAM Promotion Group (RAMPRG), built by Hitachi, Toshiba, Maxell, LG Electronics, Matsushita/Panasonic, Samsung, Lite-On and Teac. The specification distinguishes between:

- DVD-RAM version 1.0 (1997), recording speed 1×
  – Defines discs with capacity of 2.58 GB per side (24 track zones) (see also: DVD Capacity)
- DVD-RAM version 2.0 (1999), recording speed 2×
  – Defines discs with more common capacity of 4.7 GB per side (35 track zones)
- DVD-RAM version 2.1 (2000)
  – Introduces 8-cm discs with capacity of 1.46 GB per side (14 track zones)
- DVD-RAM version 2.2 (2004) divides drives and discs into two classes due to breaking compatibility:
  – Class 0, recording speed 2×/3×/5×
  – Class 1, recording speed 6×/8×/12×/16× (DVD-RAM2)

Speeds more than 2× are defined by Optional Specifications (Nx-speed DVD-RAM):

- Rev. 1.0 (2002) - 3×-speed
- Rev. 2.0 (2004) - 5×-speed
- Rev. 3.0 (2005) - 6×-speed
- Rev. 4.0 (2005) - 8×-speed
- Rev. 5.0 (2005) - 12×-speed
- Rev. 6.0 (2005) - 16×-speed (never released)

=== Diameters ===
DVD-RAM discs can have 12 or 8 cm in diameter, around 5 or 3 inches respectively. The latter variant is mainly intended for camcorders that use DVD as storage media and also exists with capacities of 1.46 GB for a single-sided disc, 2.8 GB for a double-sided disc, and 5.6 GB for a dual-layer double sided disc, however, they are relatively uncommon. DVD-RAMs were originally solely sold in disc caddy cartridges; recent DVD recorders can work with discs either with or without a cartridge, and many devices do not work with cartridges. Discs can be removed from cartridges for use with these drives (except with type 1 media, see table above).

=== Cartridge types ===
DVD-RAM cartridge types
Size	Bare disc		Non-removable cartridge		Removable cartridge		Empty cartridge/no disc	
sides	single	double	single	double	single	double	single	double
12 cm	yes (type 0)	none	type 1	type 1	type 2	type 4	type 3	type 5
8 cm	yes (type 0)	none	none	none	type 7	type 6	type 9	type 8

== Compatibility ==
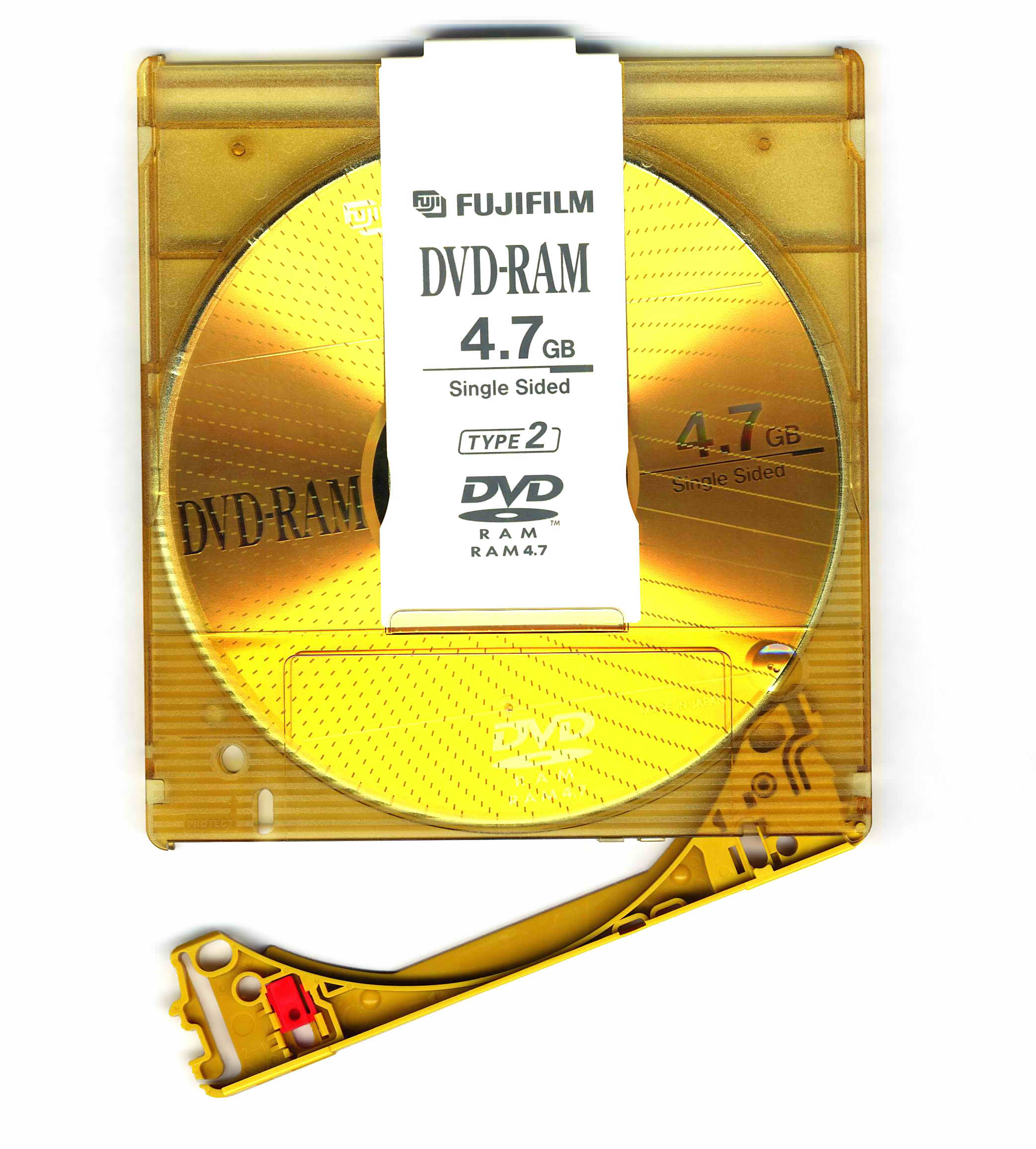
A DVD-RAM Type 2

Many operating systems like the classic Mac OS (from Mac OS 8.6 up), macOS, Linux, and Microsoft Windows XP can use DVD-RAM directly, while earlier versions of Windows require separate device drivers or the program InCD.

Windows XP can only write directly to FAT32 formatted DVD-RAM discs. For UDF formatted discs, which are considered faster, a third-party UDF file system driver capable of writing or software such as InCD or DLA are required. Windows Vista and later can natively access and write to both FAT32 and UDF formatted DVD-RAM discs using mastered burning method or packet writing. Even though it is possible to use any file system one likes, very few perform well on DVD-RAM. This is because some file systems frequently overwrite data on the disc and the table of contents is contained at the start of the disc. Windows Vista (and later) implement the CPRM data protection and thus discs formatted under Windows XP (or earlier) have compatibility issues with Vista onwards (and vice versa).

The classic Mac OS up to 9.2 can read and write HFS, HFS+, FAT, and UDF formatted DVD-RAM discs directly. In Mac OS X (versions 10.0.x through 10.4.x) UDF-formatting of DVD-RAM is no longer supported, instead formatting and writing DVD-RAM is done in HFS+ format. (UDF support was re-implemented in 10.5 Leopard) (HFS and UFS should also be supported on older versions of Mac OS X that retain support for these file systems.)

Many DVD standalone players and recorders do not work with DVD-RAM. However, within "RAMPRG" (the DVD-RAM Promotion Group consisting of Hitachi, Toshiba, Maxell, LG Electronics, Matsushita/Panasonic, Samsung, Lite-On, Teac) there were a number of well-known manufacturers of standalone players, recorders, and camcorders that could use DVD-RAM. Panasonic, for instance, had a range of players and recorders which made full use of the advantages of DVD-RAM.

The last DVD-RAM Specification, DVD-RAM2 (also called RAM2 or Class 1), is not compatible with DVD drives that do not specifically allow reading DVD-RAM2 discs. DVD-RAM2 medium was brought to the market in Japan, but was not launched worldwide.

Some high end products such as IBM System p mainframes require DVD-RAM instead of DVD-RW.

Many half-height DVD Multi Recorder drives released between 2006 and 2010, including the TSSTcorp SH-S182/S183 (2006) and SH-S203/TS-H653B (2007) have officially adapted support for 12× DVD-RAM speeds, while more recent DVD writers such as the SH-224DB (2013) and Blu-ray writers such as the LG BE16NU50 (2016) have restricted the supported DVD-RAM writing speed to 5×.

The Nintendo Wii U can use DVD-RAM with a separate burner drive for extended storage over USB

== Advantages ==
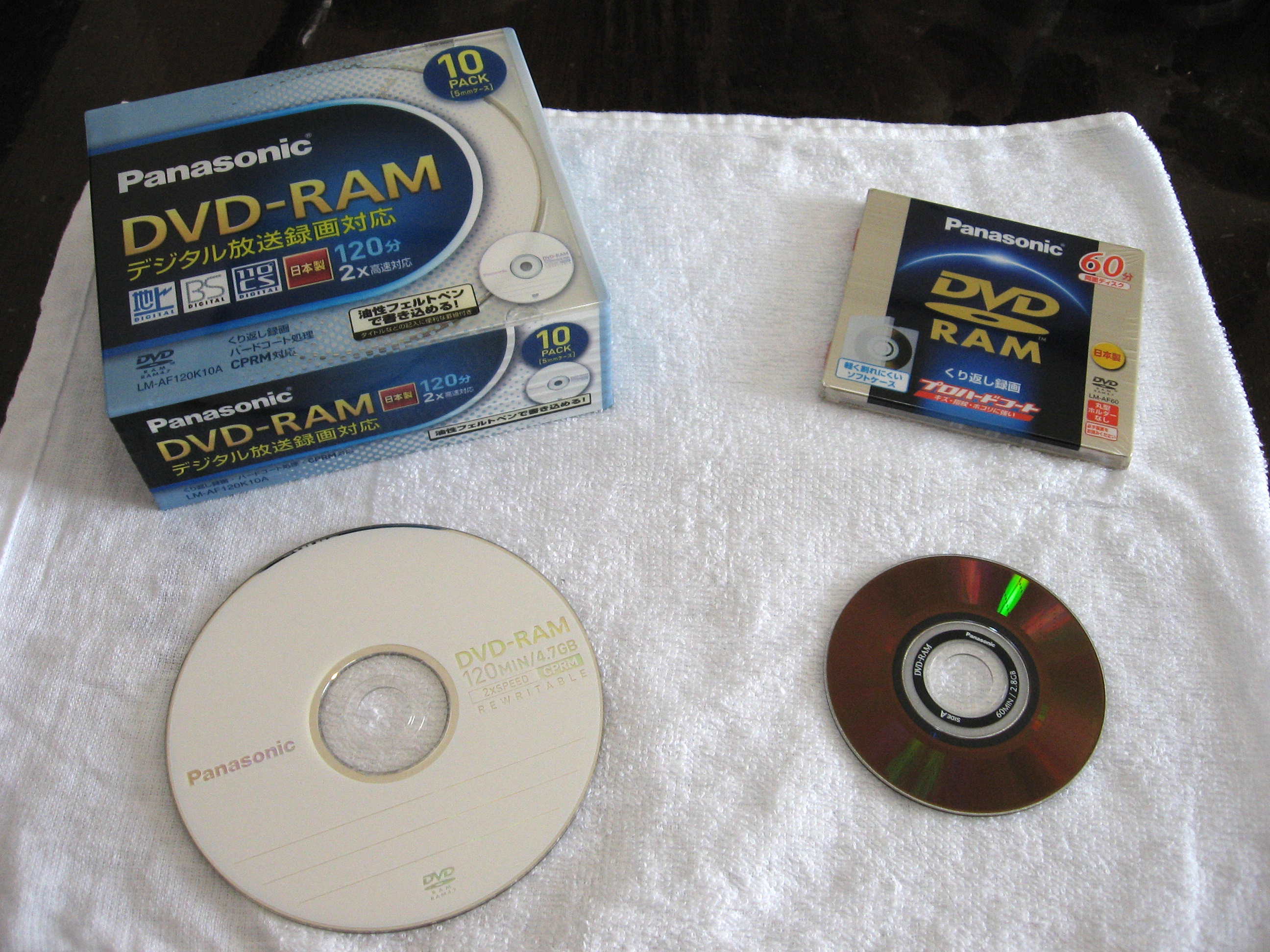
A DVD-RAM for DVD recorders

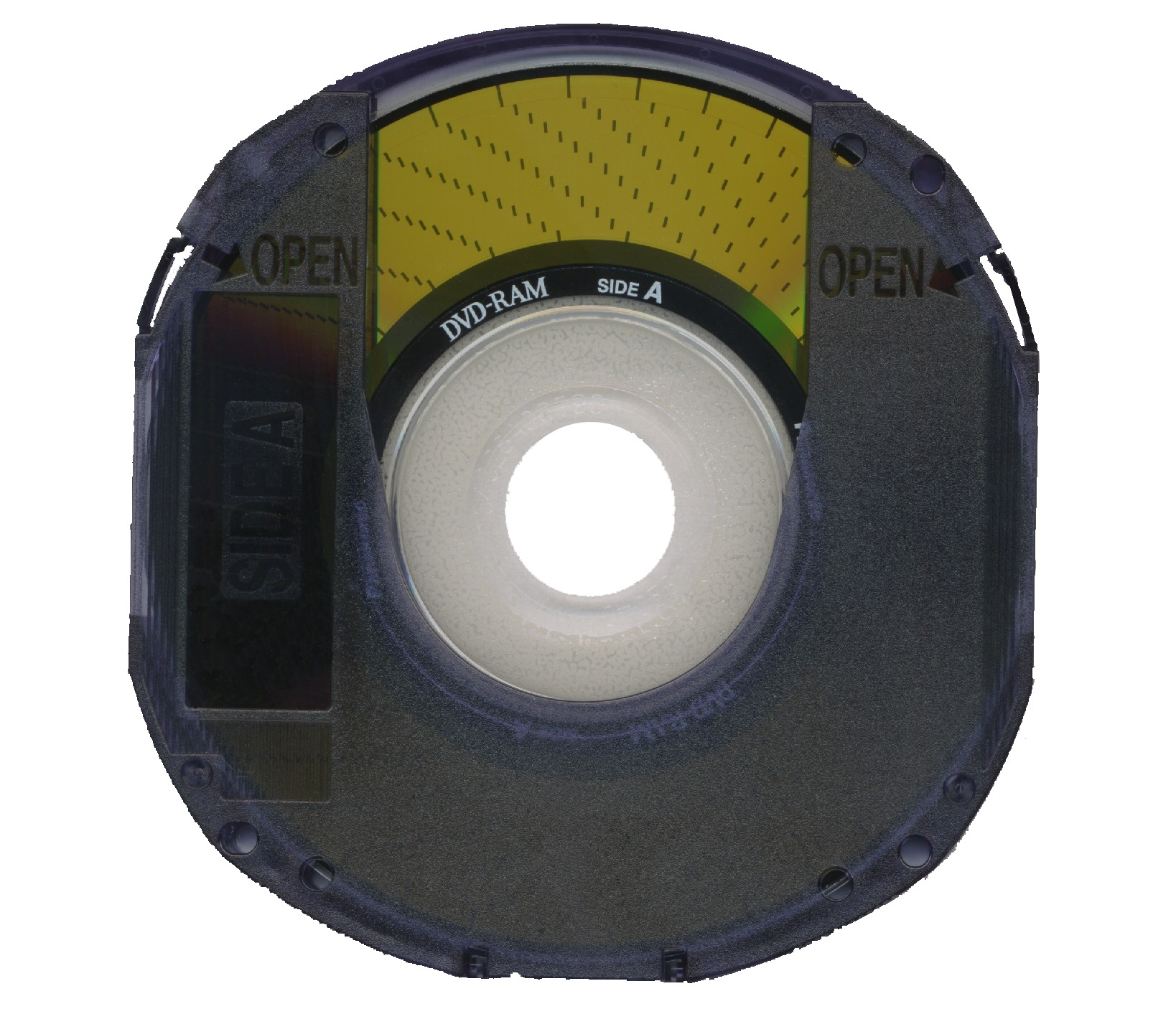
A miniDVD-RAM with DVD round holder

How to open a DVD-RAM cartridge (caddy)

- Long life – without physical damage, data is retained for an estimated 30 years. For this reason, it is used for archival storage of data.
- Can be rewritten over 100,000 times for the lowest write speed discs (DVD±RW can be rewritten approx. 1,000 times). Faster DVD-RAMs allow fewer rewrites (3× speed: 100,000, 5× speed: 10,000), but still more than DVD+RW or DVD-RW. (These are theoretical numbers. In practice they could be smaller depending on the drive, the treatment of the disc and the file system.)
- Reliable writing of discs. Verification done in hardware by the drive, so post-write verification by software is unnecessary. Software verification is disabled in all current DVD Video Recorders.
- Disc defect management designed to safeguard data.
- DVD-burning software may not be required – discs can be used and accessed like a removable hard disk. Mac OS (8.6 or later) uses DVD-RAM directly. Windows XP uses DVD-RAM directly for FAT32-formatted discs only. Windows Vista is able to write directly to both FAT32- and UDF-formatted DVD-RAM discs from within Windows Explorer. Device drivers or other software are needed for earlier versions of Windows.
- Very fast access of small files on the disc.
- Small 2 KB disc block size wastes less space when writing small files.
- Finalization not necessary. For video recording use, other media such as DVD+RW (when used in DVD+VR mode) do not require a separate finalisation either as finalisation is automatic. The table of contents can be overwritten in this latter media.
- Media available with or without protective cartridges; can be used in the cartridge by many devices.
- In some video recorders DVD-RAM can be written to and read at the same time, allowing one program to be recorded and a different one, or an earlier part of the same one (time slip recording), to be viewed at the same time. DVD+RW recorders can achieve the same thing, and more recently some DVD-RW recorders achieve it as well (though only at the slower recording speeds).
- Usable with some high-end security digital video recorders, such as the Tecton Darlex, as a secure and long-lasting export medium.
- Holds more data when using Double Sided discs than dual-layer DVD+RW and DVD-RW - 9.4 GB for DVD-RAM vs 8.5 GB for DVD+RW DL and DVD-RW DL.
- Has write-protect tabs to prevent accidental deletion when used in a cartridge.

== Disadvantages ==
- High-speed media unavailability: Only 3× and 5× discs were readily available, with 12× RAM2 discs being among the rarest of optical media and never sold outside Japan.
- Higher media cost.
- Less compatibility than DVD+RW and DVD-RW on many DVD devices and early DVD drives (example:), despite DVD-RAM predating both formats (as noted above).
- If random writes are performed with a constant linear velocity (CLV), which may be the only available speed mode on specific drives and/or media, the speed of the rotary engine needs to be re-adjusted each time the pickup system jumps to another position on the disc, significantly impeding transfer speeds.

== See also ==
- Chase Play
- MultiLevel Recording
- Phase-change Dual
- List of optical disc manufacturers
- Live File System
