= Quadraphonic open reel tape =

Discrete 4-channel quadraphonic sound system

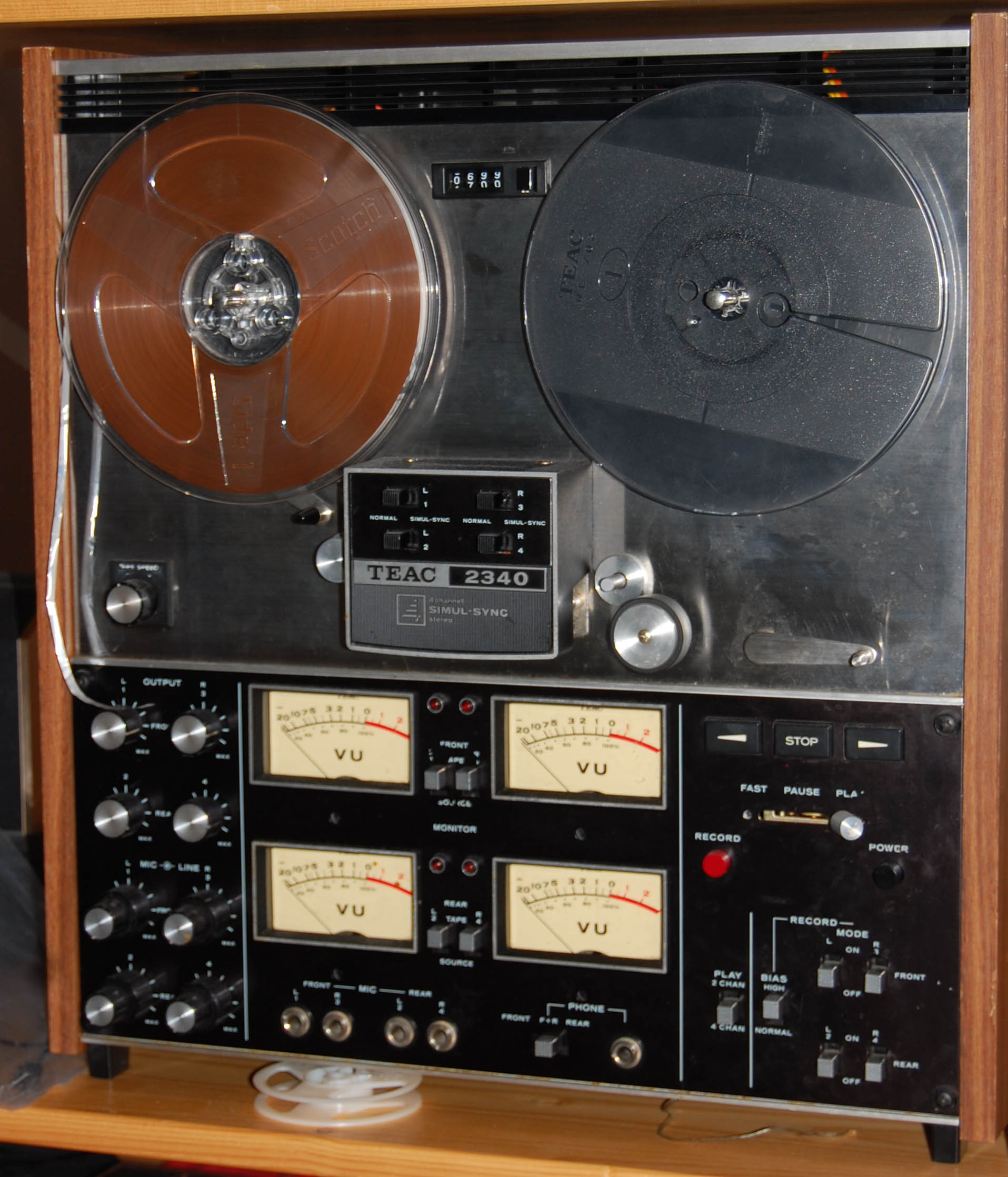
The TEAC A-2340 four-channel reel-to-reel tape unit from the 1970s was capable of playing Q4 tapes as well as making new four-channel recordings. These machines were one of the best ways to enjoy high quality, discrete four-channel sound at home.

Quadraphonic open reel tape or Q4 was the first consumer format for quadraphonic sound recording and playback. Pre-recorded tapes in this format were introduced in the United States by the Vanguard Recording Society in June 1969. Specialized machines to play these tapes were introduced by electronics manufacturers such as TEAC Corporation at about the same time.

== History ==
This was a consumer, or home format based on the much larger and more expensive professional reel-to-reel tape multitrack recording systems that had been built for recording studios by 1954. Professional four-track machines used either one inch or ½-inch tape at a speed of 15 or 30 inches per second (IPS) for the highest quality sound.

Prices of consumer four-track machines were rather high but still affordable. Sound quality was judged to be excellent by home users at the time. Recordings had a relatively high signal-to-noise ratio and the tapes allowed for full four-channel "discrete" playback with superior channel separation over the "matrix" four-channel quadraphonic systems used on LP phonograph records. In order to keep costs as affordable as possible, home machines used slower tape speeds and narrower track widths compared to professional machines. Home models may have also lacked professional features.

Like other quadraphonic formats it was unsuccessful and not widely adopted. Recording companies mostly stopped selling pre-recorded Q4 tapes by the late 1970s.

== Use as home multitrack recorders ==
As the popularity of four-channel quadraphonic pre-recorded tapes declined, electronics manufactures continued to manufacture the recorders for a new market. In 1972 TEAC introduced the first home four-track recorders with Simul-Sync that were capable of overdubbing. Musicians used them as the basis of home recording studios and created sophisticated home demo recordings for the first time. Some of these recordings were also released commercially to the public. TEAC, and its TASCAM division, as well as other manufacturers sold many of these machines to musicians well into the 1990s.

== Operation ==
All four tracks are used in one direction on ¼-inch tape, playing at a speed of 7½ IPS (twice the 3¾ IPS speed of many other consumer reel-to-reel tapes). Quadraphonic tapes have only one music program and are "one-sided" in contrast with the two sides of consumer stereo reel-to-reel tapes. The special track configuration and the higher speed of pre-recorded Q4 reels means that the tape length is four times longer than a comparable stereo tape recorded at 3¾ IPS.

The four fully discrete tracks had full-bandwidth (unlike Q8 cartridges which had a more limited frequency range). Q4 tapes used a faster speed and wider track width than Q8.

== Compatibility ==
Q4 tapes or home four-channel reel-to-reel recordings are not compatible with comparable stereo machines. When these recordings are played on stereo machines only two of the four channels can be heard at a time.
