= Caddy (hardware) =

Plastic enclosure used historically for optical media

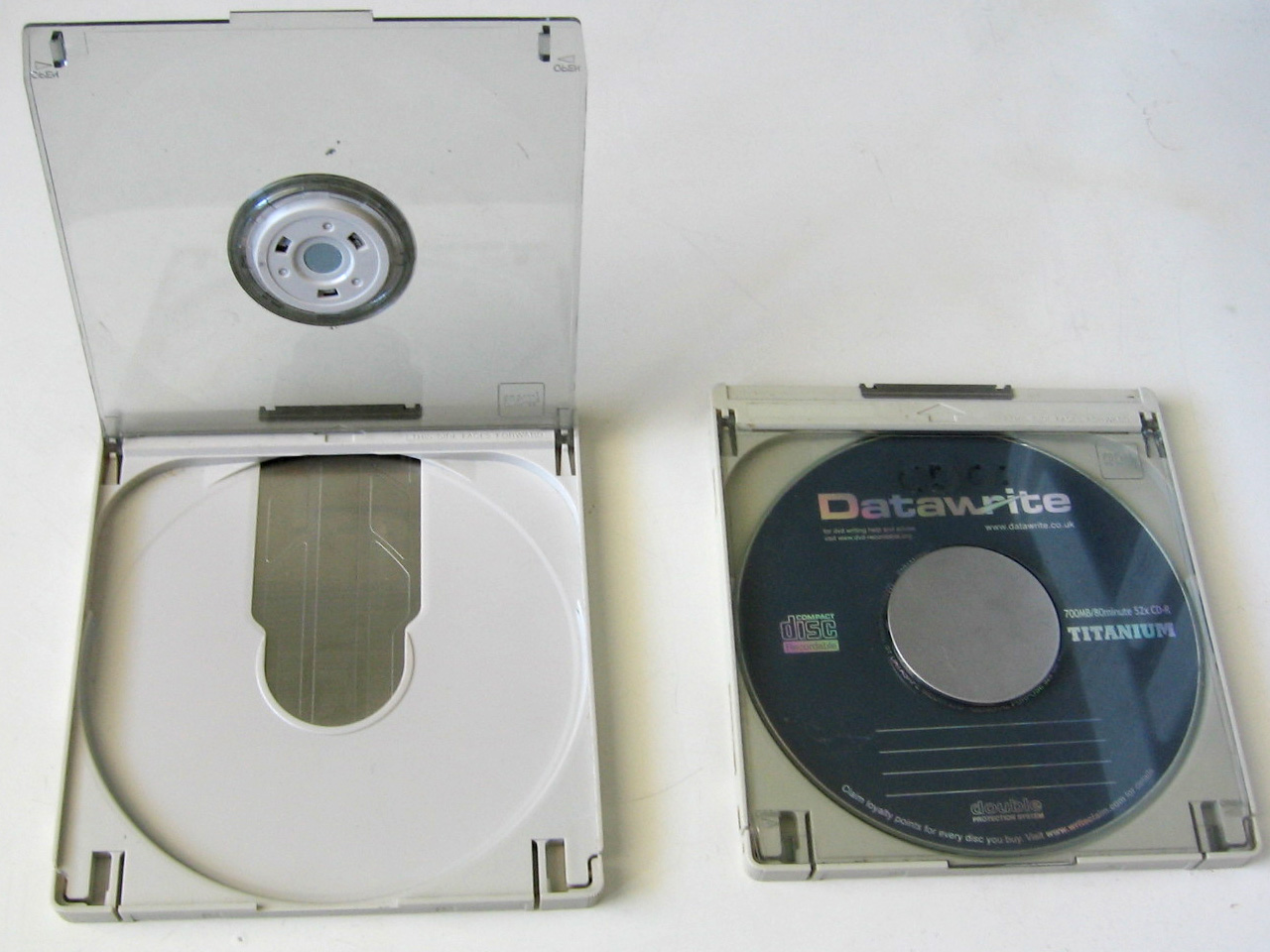
Two Compact Disc caddies

In computer hardware, a caddy is a container used to protect an optical media disc from damage when handling. Its functionality is similar to that of the 3.5" floppy disk's jacket.

Its use dates back to at least the Capacitance Electronic Disc in 1981, and they were also used in initial versions of the Blu-ray Disc. As a cost-saving measure, newer versions use hard-coating technology to prevent scratches and do not need a caddy.

Caddies may be an integral part of the medium, as in some DVD-RAM discs, or separately attached.

== Examples ==
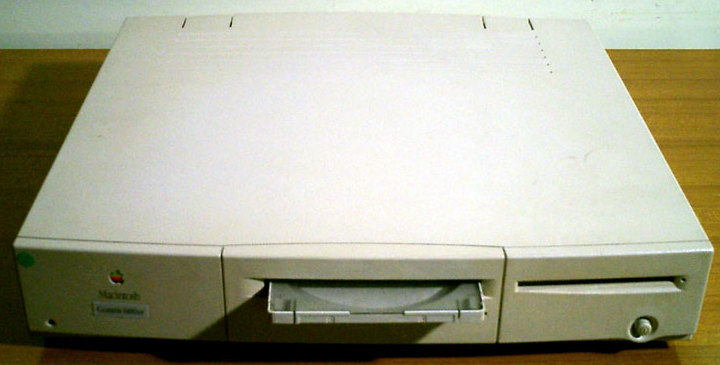
A Macintosh Quadra 660AV with a caddy-based CD drive

Caddies date at least to the Capacitance Electronic Disc, which used a caddy from 1981 to protect the grooves of the disc.

Some early CD-ROM drives used a mechanism where CDs had to be inserted into special cartridges, somewhat similar in appearance to a jewel case. Although the idea behind this—a tougher plastic shell to protect the disc from damage—was sound, it did not gain wide acceptance among disc manufacturers. Consumers also eschewed the intended and pricey use, which required each disc to be protected with a caddy for its full useful life, preferring to only buy one caddy and transfer the discs between their traditional storage jewel cases and the caddy when in use, then the reverse when finished.

Drives that used the caddy format required "bare" discs to be placed into a caddy before use, making them less convenient to use. Drives that worked this way were referred to as caddy drives or caddy load(ing), but from about 1994 most computer manufacturers moved to tray-loading, or slot-loading drives.

The same system is still available for more recent formats such as DVD-RAMs but is not common.

The PlayStation Portable, UMD disc is a similar concept, using a small proprietary DVD-type disc, in a fixed unopenable caddy as both a copy protection and damage prevention measure.

The MiniDisc is a similar concept again, using a small proprietary Magneto-optical type disc instead, also in a fixed unopenable caddy.
