= DVD+VR =

Video format standard for DVD+R and DVD+RW media

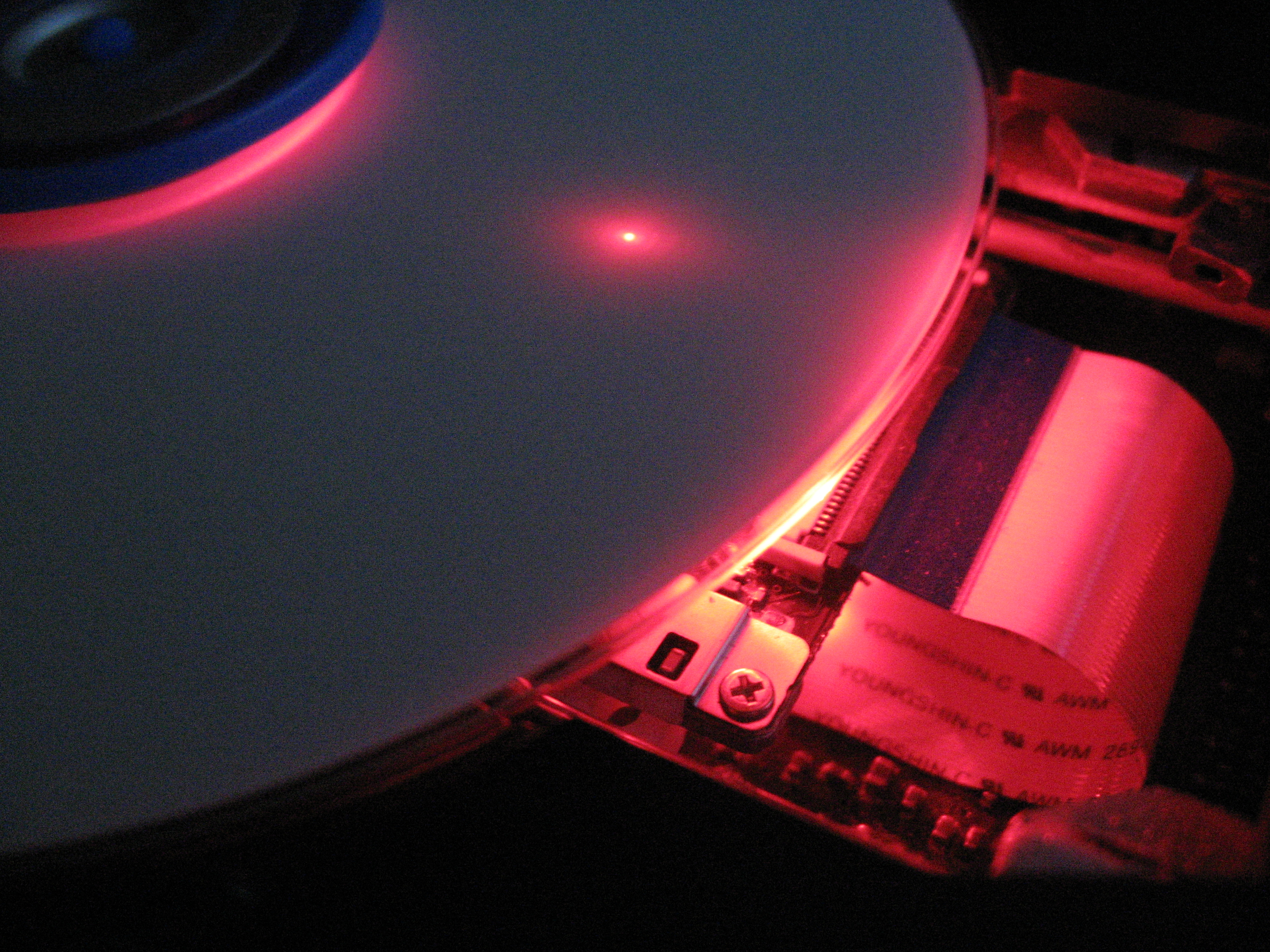
DVD burner operating with the cover removed

The DVD+VR standard defines a logical format for DVD-Video compliant recording on optical discs. It is intended to be used on DVD+R and DVD+RW media. Most DVD video recorders in the market that support these two types of media also use the DVD+VR format for recording video on them. It is possible to use the DVD+VR format with DVD-R and DVD-RW discs and some recorders exist which do this. The versatility of such recorders is usually limited to eliminate the need for the recorder to store large amounts of video as the disc is rewritten.

== Main features ==
For the user, the DVD+VR standard offers the following main features:

- Video recording on DVD+R and DVD+RW discs.
- Up to 48 separate recordings per disc.
- Playback of recordings on regular DVD-Video players, including title menus and edits. For DVD+RW discs, playback is possible without finalization, provided the player can read DVD+RW discs. For DVD+R a finalization step is required in order to allow the media to play back on a regular DVD player, however, may be playable on another DVD recorder.
- Tape (or slot) model recording. When a title is deleted, the freed space can be filled with a title of the same length, giving a user experience similar to a regular tape-based video recorder. On DVD+R discs, titles can be deleted, but obviously no space is freed.
- Editing capabilities such as bookmarks, chapter marks, and play lists.
- As of version 2 of the standard, also video and data (such as digital pictures) may be combined on a single disc.

== Technical format overview ==
The DVD+VR format basically defines how to record video in a DVD-Video compliant manner to an optical disc. The resulting disc should, after finalization, play back on any DVD Video player that can physically read the media. The DVD-Video standard was never intended to be used for recording though, and in order to achieve the goal of making a DVD Video recorder, some tricks are needed when recording the disc.

For example: For the DVD video format, a recording is stored in an MPEG program stream, containing DVD-Video specific packets for navigation purposes—such as fast forward and fast reverse. In order to fill these packets properly, an encoding system needs to examine considerable amounts of video data, both before and after the navigation point. Video recorder systems typically have too little memory to achieve this fully, so logically a work-around for this has been introduced.

In order to allow editing, and building recording databases, next to the /VIDEO_TS directory that is present on any DVD Video disc, also a /VIDEO_RM directory is present, holding the recorder meta-data. To a regular video player this data is irrelevant, and such player will ignore it.

From a file system point of view, the media are very similar to regular DVD Video media. Both in finalized and in unfinalized form the disc contains a UDF file system, bridged with ISO 9660. For unfinalized DVD+R discs, this is hidden to the eye: the space for the file system and DVD Video data remains reserved and unrecorded at the start of the disc, until the disc is finalized.

== See also ==
- DVD-VR
- VR Mode
- DVD formats
- Universal Disk Format
- DVD+RW and DVD+R
