= DiscT@2 =

Technology that allows the writing of visible graphics on common optical discs

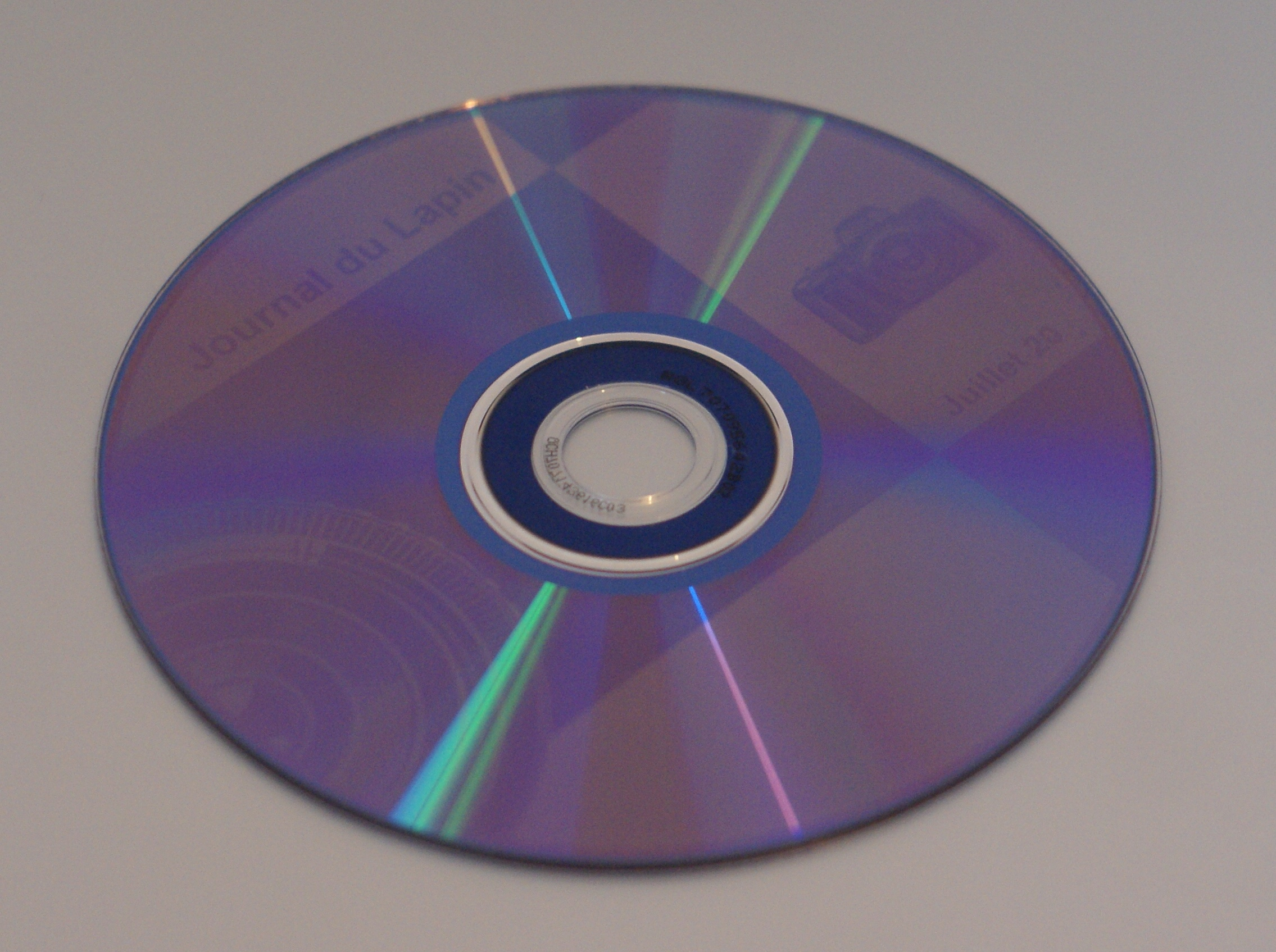
A DiscT@2-engraved disc. The label can be seen coexisting with the data on the data side of the disc.

The DiscT@2 logo

DiscT@2 (read as "disc tattoo") is a method of writing text and graphics to the data side of a CD-R or DVD disc first introduced by Yamaha in 2002. While often compared with the later LabelFlash and LightScribe technologies, which also offered users consumer-grade computerized disc labeling, DiscT@2 is different in that it required no proprietary media and wrote the graphics to the data side of the disc.

== Technical details ==
Any CD-R or DVD disc can be engraved by a compatible optical drive, and read by any optical drive. However, as discs can be made from multiple different materials, Yamaha recommended at the time that discs made with blue azo dye be used for the best results. Contemporaneous reviews reported that discs made of phthalocyanine resulted in "barely discernible" images.

DiscT@2 writes its label in the unused portion of the data side of the disc. Therefore, as more and more data is written to the disc, the available surface area for the label becomes smaller and smaller—a full disc would not be able to have any label burned to it at all. According to The New York Times, even having only 50MB free on the disc would still leave a ≈0.25 inches (0.64 cm) wide band where a label could be written. By varying the intensity of the laser while writing, 128 shades of gray were available. Before engraving, the graphics would need to be converted by software from Cartesian to polar coordinates.

While a CD-R or DVD cannot be rewritten, new data can be appended to old data in a conventional disc when it is not full. In a DiscT@2-engraved disc, by contrast, this is impossible; the disc must be closed after writing the label, even if the label doesn't extend all the way to the disc's edge. This is because data on compact discs is written via a process called eight-to-fourteen modulation. As a consequence of this encoding scheme, the "pits" on the disc can only be between 3T (0.83mm @ 1.2m/s) and 11T (3.05mm @ 1.2m/s). For the fine details in a photograph and in some fonts, for example, 3T is too large; the original DiscT@2 drive, for example, was capable of making pits of less than 0.1mm. Therefore, if the label were able to be read as data, it would be invalid; meaning that some optical drives or consumer equipment might not be able to retrieve data after the label even if it could be written. Therefore, the disc's table of contents must always come before the label.

As higher precision is needed, engraving an image takes longer than writing data; according to Tom's Hardware, the average time is between six and fifteen minutes.

=== Drive compatibility ===
- Yamaha CRW-F1 (July 2002, first to market)
- Pioneer DVR-111D, DVR-111L, DVR-111, and DVR-A11XL, DVR-218L
- NEC ND-3550A, ND-3551A, ND-4550A, ND-4551A & ND-4571A

== Reception ==
DiscT@2 failed to catch on in the market place; the original drive to support the feature, the CRW-F1, was seen by reviewers as being attractive primarily due to its speed and not due to DiscT@2. In a March 2006 retrospective, PC Magazine primarily blamed the failure of the technology on the impracticality of using the data side for labels, the low speed of label writing compared to data, and the low contrast images it produced.

Despite this, optical drives supporting DiscT@2 continued to be released until at least 2010. This is partially because LabelFlash optical drives were backwards compatible with DiscT@2.

== Reimplementation ==
Open-source software accomplishing the same goal with wide support for drives and CD-R media, CDImage, was developed in 2022. Since generic drives don't measure absolute angle of the disc's rotation, the technique relies on calibrating parameters of the spiral by burning test discs from a single CD-R batch, whose pregroove with synchronizing wobble was pressed from the same master, or using parameters of known discs shared by the developer or user community.

== See also ==
- Labelflash
- LightScribe
- LabelTag
