= LabelTag =

LabelTag can create a circular label on the data side of any DVD+R, DVD-R, or CD-R disc containing basic information visible to the eye. When burning the data, the label is printed directly behind that data in the same recording session, and on normal recording speed on the same recording layer side. LabelTag works on any disc and does not require a special disc like LightScribe. As of June 2011, LabelTag was an exclusive technology of Lite-On for its DVD writer drives.

An older alternative disc labeling technique was DiscT@2. To record the label on the opposite or back side of the disc by the drive itself LightScribe and LabelFlash are current standards. Besides that, printing using an inkjet printer is currently widely used.

== System description ==
The PC host application controls the data location of the regular user data, including the structure of the file system. In the host application the user label input is transformed into a bit-map representation. The host sends print commands with the pixel information of the image to the drive. The drive interface, records the regular data, including lead in, session intros and closures, and finally lead out. The drive Interface (IF) part takes care of the interpretation of the pixel information and location of the image on the disc. The drive Servo part finally records the pixel information on the correct location including the encoded line numbering. The drive Servo part controls the record power, motor frequency, pixel frequency and channel bit frequency.

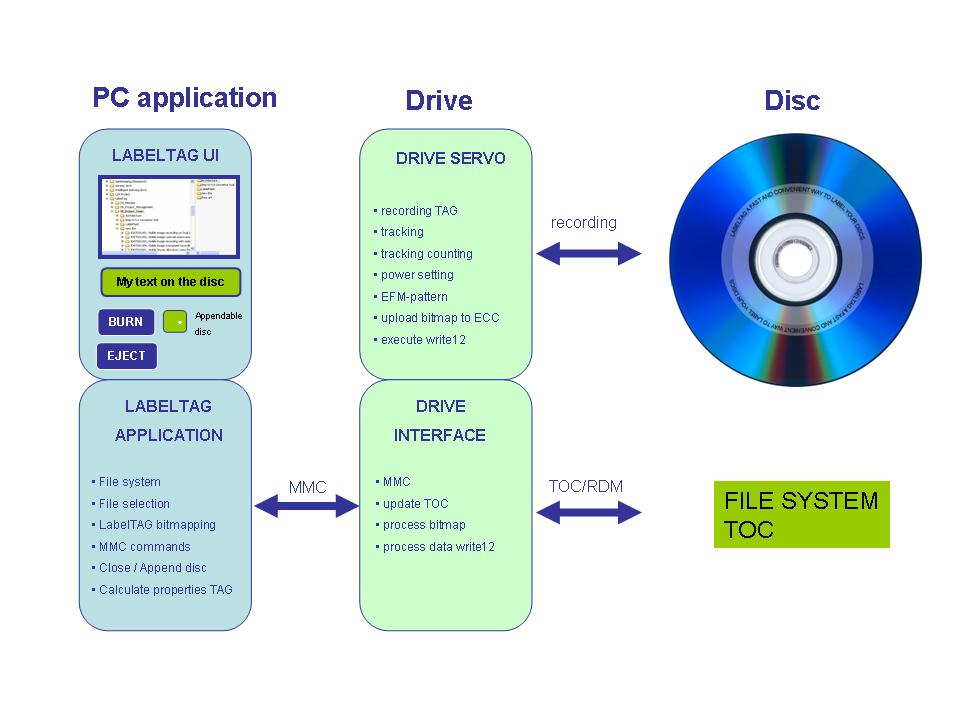
Overview of LabelTag system functions

Overview of System Parameters
Item	Description
Disc type	DVD+R SL and DVD-R SL
Disc format	Multi session
Image types	Black and White
Pixel height	132 tracks, 98 μm
Number of pixels	3528 pixels per 360° turn
File systems	ISO9660 or UDF for data DVD-data disc, UDF bridge for DVD-video discs

=== Location and time of image recording ===
The label can be added or appended to the disc at any time if disc space is available. The disc status has to be "appendable" prior to the image recording. The label is recorded adjacent to the last recorded user data. It is up to the user to finalize the disc after the label is added. In case the disc remains "appendable" more user data or more labels can be added. The first section of the disc (26 mm) is used for all drives to do the start-up calibrations. Therefore, no label can be recorded at the inner diameter of the disc. If there is a label in this area, the risk of poor performance is big.

=== Space usage ===
If you add a label on the data side of the disc, then this space is no longer available for data. The amount of space it takes depends on the size (width) of the label and the location of the label on the disc. The wider the label and the more it is located on the outside of the disc, the more space it takes. In other words: the bigger the label, the more disc surface is occupied and thus the more data-space you sacrifice. For example: a 5 mm label at the inside requires 10% capacity, and at the outside of the disc about 20% of the disc capacity.

=== Image visibility and recording process ===
For LabelTag, the Eight-to-Fourteen Modulation (EFM+) channel code properties are modulated to create the visual label. In the EFM+ code table, the user data bytes are transformed into specific sequences of pits and lands, ranging from 3T up to 14T channel bits. To create a pit, a high power pulse from the laser is focused into a small spot on the dye layer. This heats the dye material such that an irreversible transformation of the dye material creates the pit. To create a land, the laser is turned to a low power, such that no transformation in the dye material occurs. In general for DVD+/-R media, the recorded marks have a different visual reflection. Therefore, by recording long sequences of reflective marks or reflective spaces one can create the visible label. To maintain maximum backwards compatibility, LabelTag uses a majority of long marks in the recording layer for a dark pixel, while the bright image pixels are created by a majority of long spaces in the recording layer. Only in that case a sufficiently large Differential Phase Detection (DPD) tracking signal is generated. This DPD signal is required for DVD players to jump over the Label area to reach beyond the label appended user data.

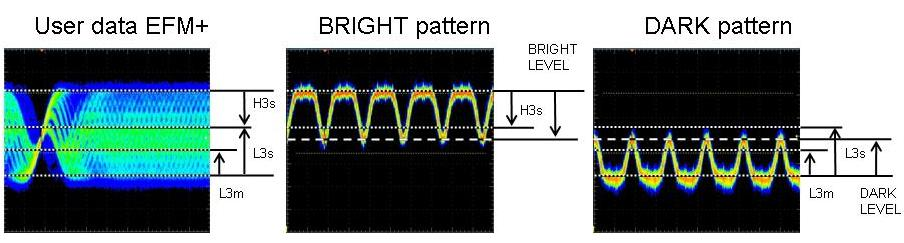
Scope traces of eyepatterns on DVD+R user data EFM+ (left), BRIGHT pattern (middle), DARK pattern (right).

During the recording the normal servo processes are used. The beam follows the tracks (grooves). The spot is in focus on the recording layer. Each image line is recorded by repeating the same recording pattern several tracks. In case of DVD with a track pitch of 740 nm, a 100μm image line width is obtained by repeating the pattern 132 consecutive tracks. Because every label pixel is constructed by 132 consecutive tracks, higher image sharpness and contrast is obtained compared to DiscT@2. Each visible pixel is about 40μm × 100μm (w × l) at the inner radius up to 100μm × 100μm (w × l) at the outer radius. This leads to a picture quality above 250DPI.

As the label and the user data are recorded in the same dye layer of the DVD+/-R media, and label pattern uses run-lengths within the EFM+ range, the same (castle) write pulse form is used as for the regular user data recordings. To enhance the contrast a higher recording power is optional.

=== Backwards compatibility and logical format ===
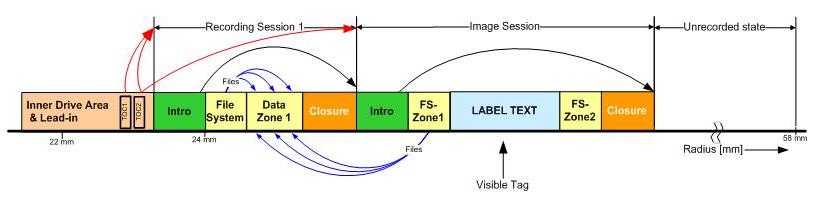
File System and Physical Format pointers for the LabelTag Image session.

After the visual tag is written to the disc, this disc remains accessible, readable and appendable for any legacy drives. For that, the label is recorded within the user data zone of the disc in its own Image Session. Then any regular DVD drive capable to read multi session DVDs is able to access the user data zone beyond the label. Very old DVD drives, supporting only single session DVD, might only retrieve data stored in the first session.

Access of the LabelTag area itself is prevented by two protection mechanisms:

- At File system level, ISO 9660 or Universal Disk Format (UDF), no file pointers to the label area are present.
- At Physical Format Level, both the Inner Drive Area and & Lead-in area Session pointers (TOC or RMD) and the Session Control Data Information in the Intro or Border-in skip the Visual Image Window by pointing to the actual end of the Image Session Data Zone or RZone.

Besides, directly around the label a buffer zone is present that enhances the seek performance for the adjacent user data zones. Finally, a sufficient DPD tracking signal is required at the image location. For that reason, the bright and dark pixels are created by recording marks and spaces within the EFM+-runlength range.

=== Multiple labels and data sessions ===
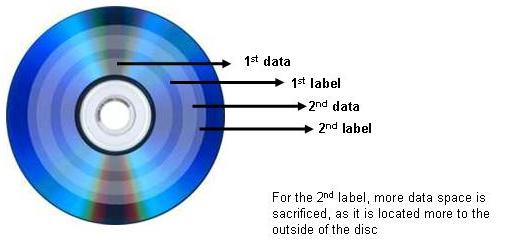
Multi session and tagging explained.

The LabelTag format is flexible. It allows as many labels on a disc as space is available. A multisession disc allows burning more data and labels at a later stage. Once the disc is finalized, no more data or labels can be added. But, the more labels you add, the less space you have left for data.

== LabelTag application ==
To record a label on the disc, the application sends pixel information to the drive with a SCSI command.

The application

- Generates pixels based on User Input.
- Defines the LabelTag properties, like size and location.
- Sends the LabelTag pixel information to the drive, using an SCSI-command sequence.
- Sends the FS-Zone1 and FS-Zone2 data containing imported pointers to the location of the root directory as recorded in the last active Primary Volume Descriptor
- Closes the Label by creating the Image Session Structures in the Lead-in TOC/RMD and recording the Closure/Border out.

=== WRITE12 SCSI commands ===
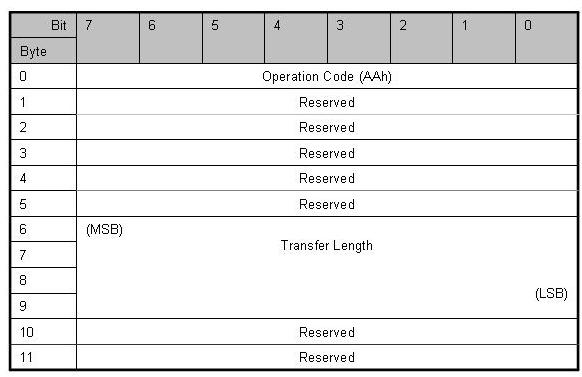
TAGWRITE command

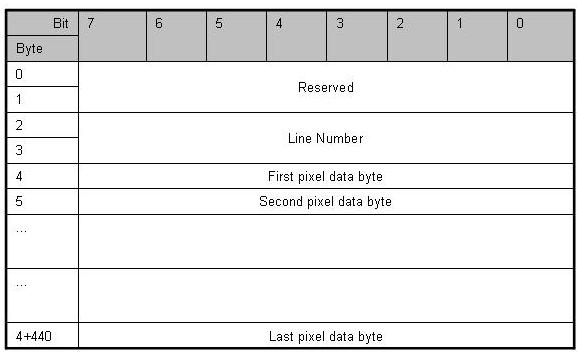
Specification of the TagWrite data format

For LabelTag no new commands are introduced; the changes are made to the already existing commands. Pixel data describing the pixels for one or more image lines is sent to the drive via the WRITE12 SCSI Write Commands. The line width and number of pixels in each line are set in the LabelTag SCSI mode pages. The WRITE12 command is called TAGWRITE command to emphasize the dedicated LabelTag SCSI mode pages settings. After this command the image data is located in the drive buffer. The drive starts writing after the buffer is full or a SYNCHRONIZE CACHE command is sent.

=== Image data format ===
The image data is formatted by the application as bitmap into bright pixels and dark pixels. The bright pixel corresponds to bitmap 0 and the dark pixel to bitmap 1. Therefore, LabelTag allows both text and logos to be printed.

In the LabelTag mode page the following properties are exchanged:

- The number of lines n.
- The number of dots per line M.
- The line width in units of tracks.

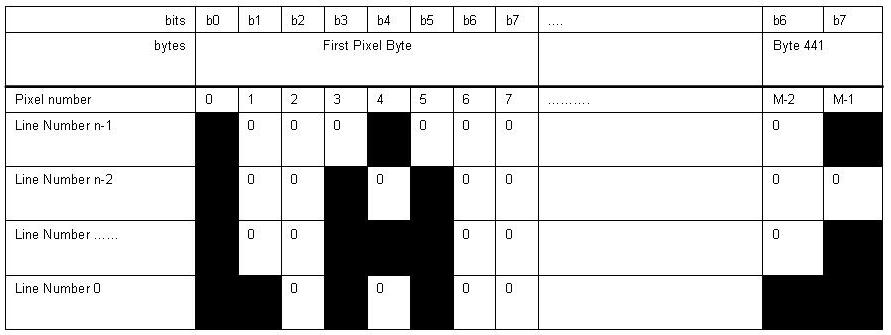
Example of text converted into pixel data.

=== Process-flow ===
The application confirms if the drive is capable of making visual images using the LabelTag technology by sending the GETCONFIGURATION command. In case the LabelTag feature is current, a supported disc with an appendable session is inserted into the drive. The printing of the Label can begin.

First the FS-Zone1 data is recorded on the next writable address. To write the image following the FS-Zone1, the mode bit is set in the LabelTag mode page. The drive is now in LabelTag mode. The data in TAGWRITE commands contains the Label pixel data. The label starts on the Next Writable Address of the inserted disc. The application sends a SYNCHRONIZE CACHE to the drive to let the drive start the image burning. The application unsets the mode bit in the LabelTag mode page to let the drive go back in data write mode. Before the drive can add the FS-Zone2, the application has to inquire the Next Writable Address from the drive to know where the end address is of the Image Window. The application finishes the LabelTag writing by closing the Image Session.

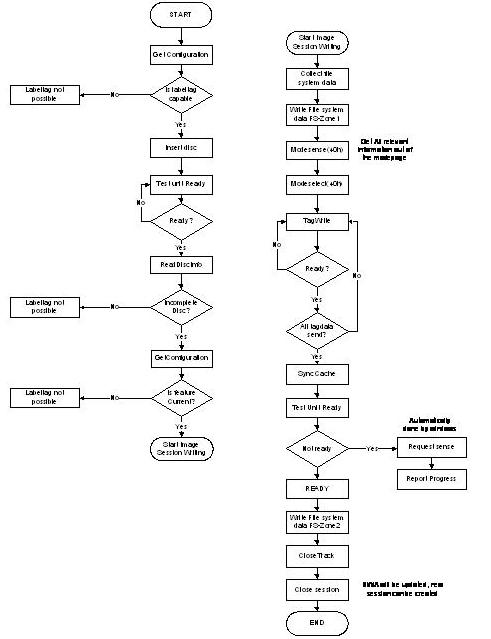
LabelTag application process flow.

== See also ==
- DVD+R
- DVD-R
- DVD
- CD/DVD file system description ISO 9660
- DVD file system description UDF Universal Disk Format
- LightScribe, a labeling technology for the label side of the disc
- Labelflash, a labeling technology for the label side of the disc
- DiscT@2, a similar to LabelTag but incompatible technology
