= Media Identification Code =

Code indicating the manufacturer of DVD

The Media Identification Code (MID) is used on DVD-R, DVD+R and DVD-RAM discs to identify the manufacturer and to assist the DVD burner to select the best write strategy for the inserted media. The technology is inherited from the ATIP code used on CD-R discs.

If the DVD burner recognizes the discs it means that the disc has been tested by the drive manufacturer to achieve the best possible burn using an optimal write strategy. The strategy is stored in the firmware. Writing to a disc with no MID code or a code that is not recognized can result in inaccurate recording and data read-back problems.

== Displaying the MID ==
The following programs can be used to display the contents of the MID

=== With Windows ===
- install DVDInfoPro by Nic Wilson (full 14-day trial available without any adverts)
- install DVDIdentifier by Kris Schoofs (freeware)

=== With Linux ===
Ubuntu and other Linux systems have dvd+rw-tools installed by default, which provides a command to display the media data:

$ dvd+rw-mediainfo /dev/scd1
INQUIRY:             [HL-DT-ST][DVDRAM GSA-4083N][1.00]
GET [CURRENT] CONFIGURATION:
 Mounted Media:      14h, DVD-RW Sequential
 '''Media ID:           TDK502sakuM3'''
 Current Write Speed: 2.0x1385=2770KB/s
 Write Speed #0:     2.0x1385=2770KB/s
GET [CURRENT] PERFORMANCE:
 Write Performance:  2.0x1385=2770KB/s@[0 -> 2254431]
 Speed Descriptor#0: 02/2254431 R@3.3x1385=4584KB/s W@2.0x1385=2770KB/s
READ DVD STRUCTURE[#10h]:
 Media Book Type:    00h, DVD-ROM book [revision 0]
 Legacy lead-out at: 2298496*2KB=4707319808
READ DVD STRUCTURE[#0h]:
 Media Book Type:    32h, DVD-RW book [revision 2]
 Last border-out at: 2045*2KB=4188160
READ DISC INFORMATION:
 Disc status:        complete
 Number of Sessions: 2
 State of Last Session: reserved/damaged
 Number of Tracks:   1
READ FORMAT CAPACITIES:
 formatted: 2254432*2048=4617076736
 00h(800): 2297888*2048=4706074624
 10h(10): 2297888*2048=4706074624
 15h(10): 2297888*2048=4706074624

=== With Mac OS X ===
drutil status

== See also ==
- Book type
- Burst cutting area
- Absolute Time in Pregroove
- Wobble frequency
- Content ID
