= Thor-CD =

Failed CD format proposal

Thor-CD was a re-recordable CD format proposed in 1988 by Tandy Corporation.

Prior to the introduction of recordable compact discs, Tandy announced a comparable CD format named Thor-CD, otherwise known as the Tandy High-Density Optical Recording (THOR) system, claiming to offer support for erasable and rewritable discs, made possible by a "secret coating material" on which Tandy had applied for patents, and reportedly based partly on a process developed by Optical Data Inc., with research and development undertaken at Tandy's Magnetic Media Research Center.

Also known as the Tandy High-Intensity Optical Recording system, THOR-CD media was intended to be playable in existing CD players, being compatible with existing CD audio and CD-ROM equipment, with the discs themselves employing a layer in which the "marks", "bumps" or "pits" readable by a conventional CD player could be established in, and removed from, the medium by a laser operating at a different frequency. Tandy's announcement was surprising enough to "catch half a dozen industries off guard", claiming availability of consumer-level audio and video products below $500 by the end of 1990, and inviting other organisations to license the technology.

Tandy's announcement attracted enthusiasm but also skepticism of Tandy's capability to deliver the system, with the latter proving to be justified, the technology having been "announced... heavily promoted; then it was delayed, and finally, it just never appeared". After being pushed back for several years, it was finally cancelled due to steep manufacturing costs.

== See also ==
- Vaporware
