= LightScribe =

Printing technology that writes labels onto special optical discs

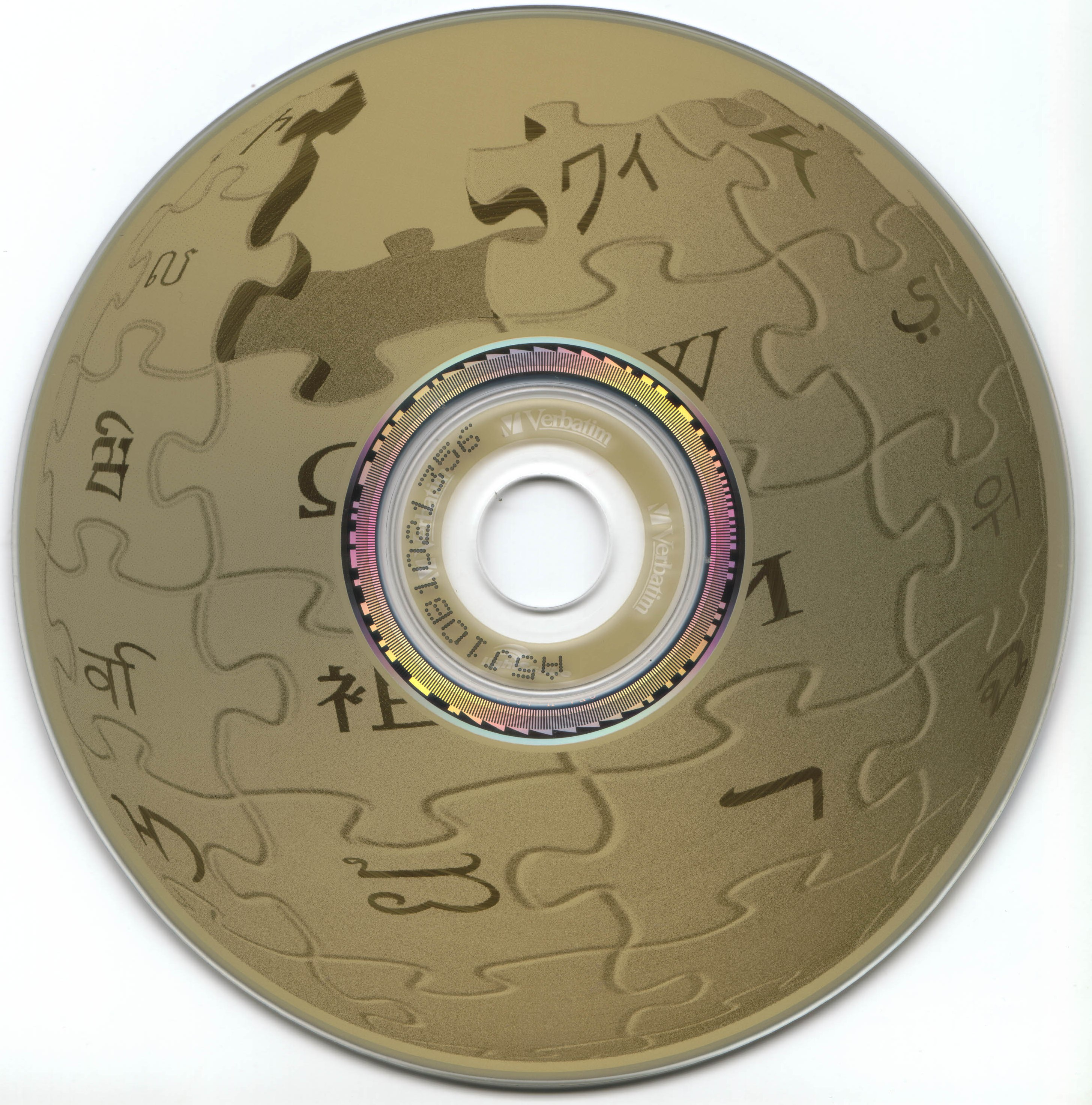
- A LightScribe Disc printed with the Wikipedia Logo.
- Original author: Daryl Anderson
- Developer: Hewlett-Packard
- Release: January 2004
- Final release: 1.18.27.10 / March 14, 2013; 13 years ago
- Platform: Cross-platform
- Available in: English, Spanish, French, German, Simplified Chinese
- Type: Computer Software
- License: Freeware, closed source
- Website: HP LightScribe Information Site Closed Nov 2013

LightScribe is an optical disc recording technology that was created by the Hewlett-Packard Company. It uses specially coated recordable CD and DVD media to produce laser-etched labels with text or graphics, as opposed to stick-on labels and printable discs. Although HP is no longer developing the technology, it is still maintained and supported by a number of independent enthusiasts.

The LightScribe method uses the laser in a way similar to when plain data are written to the disc; a greyscale image of the label is etched onto the upper side of the disc using a laser. The discs were initially available only in a sepia color but later became available in many monochromatic hues.

The purpose of LightScribe is to allow users to create direct-to-disc labels (as opposed to stick-on labels) using their optical disc writer. Special discs and a compatible disc writer are required. Before or after burning data to the read-side of the disc, the user turns the disc over and inserts it with the label side down. The drive's laser then burns the label side in such a way that an image is produced.

== History ==
LightScribe was conceived by Hewlett-Packard engineer Daryl Anderson, and the coating's chemistry was developed by Dr. Makarand Gore and brought to market through the joint design efforts of HP's imaging and optical storage divisions, where it was first introduced in January 2004 at the 2004 Consumer Electronics Show.

It was the first direct to disc labeling technology that allowed users to laser etch images to the label side of a disc. DiscT@2 technology had been on the market since 2002, but DiscT@2 allows users to burn only to the unused portion of the data side of the disc. In 2005, Labelflash became the main competitor to LightScribe.

Various brands manufactured the required media. Dual Layer DVD+Rs are the highest-capacity disc listed as available with the technology. No LightScribe Blu-ray discs were ever developed or manufactured, though Blu-ray drives with LightScribe technology (supporting the older formats) were on the market.

Companies such as HP, Samsung, LaCie and LiteOn announced that they would be phasing out LightScribe drives by June 2013. LG was one of the last companies to manufacture LightScribe drives but ultimately followed suit. On 26 November 2013, LightScribe.com, HP's official LightScribe website, was taken down. The content on the website was replaced by the following message:

Thank you for your interest in the LightScribe disc labeling technology. This website is no longer active. LightScribe software and disc utilities may be found on a number of public websites.

As of June 2026, the website redirects to HP's homepage.

== Mode of operation ==
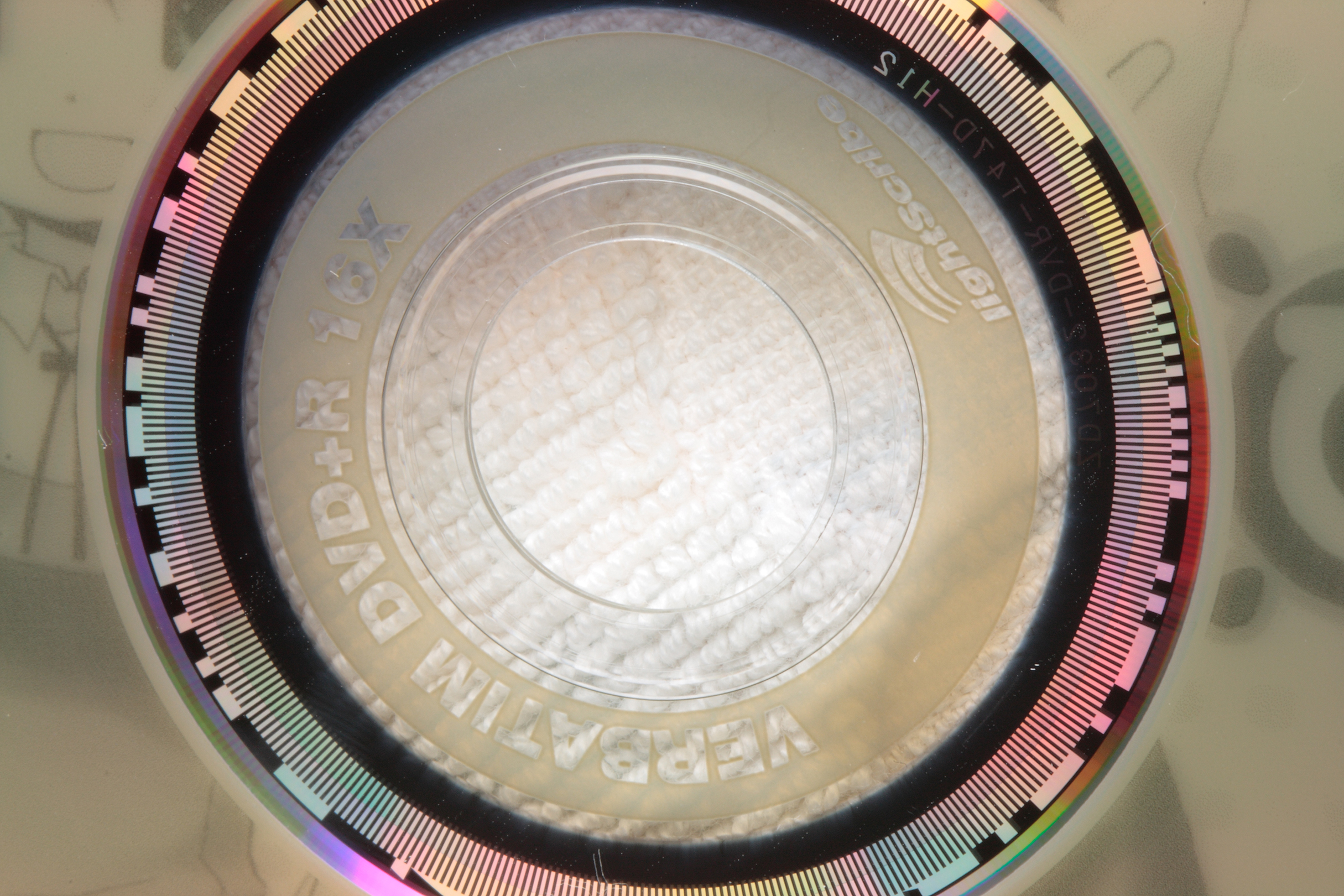
LightScribe laser tacking ring as seen on this DVD+R

The surface of a LightScribe disc is coated with a reactive dye that changes color when it absorbs 780 nm infrared laser light. The etched label will show no noticeable fading under exposure to indoor lighting for at least two years.

LightScribe labels burn in concentric circles, moving outward from the center of the disc. Images with the largest diameters will take longest to burn.

LightScribe etching is monochromatic. From late 2006, LightScribe discs were also available in various surface colors, under the v1.2 specification.

It is not possible to erase a LightScribe label and replace it with a new design, but it is possible to add more content to a label that has already been burned.

The center of every LightScribe disc has a unique code that, together with a sensor in the drive, allows the drive to know the precise rotational position of the disc. This, in combination with the drive hardware, allows it to know the precise position from the center outwards, and the disc can be labeled while spinning at high speed using these references. It also serves a secondary purpose: the same disc can be labeled with the same image multiple times. Each successive labeling will darken the blacks and increase image contrast. Successive burns are perfectly aligned.

== Drawbacks ==
Special storage precautions are necessary to prevent LightScribe discs from fading. HP's LightScribe website warns users to "keep discs away from extreme heat, humidity and direct sunlight", "store them in a cool, dark place", "use polypropylene disc sleeves rather than PVC sleeves", and also notes that "residual chemicals on one's fingers could cause discoloration of the label image". Such chemicals include common hand lotions and hair care products. Users not observing these precautions have reported some LightScribe discs to become visibly faded within two months. This drawback makes the technology unsuitable for applications involving continuous handling, and for such popular uses as car music compilation discs, which typically have unavoidable high light and temperature exposure. Since many disc players present internal temperatures significantly higher than room temperature, LightScribe discs should also not be left in disc players for long periods of time.

LightScribe discs may form a visible white powder coating. This is due to crystallization of some of the label-side coating. It is not harmful and can easily be removed with a water-dampened cloth. Wiping the disc with a damp cloth does not harm the inscribed label. The companies behind LightScribe have never explained which conditions might lead to this reaction, nor the precautions that could be taken to avoid it.

== Other uses ==
In 2012, a LightScribe optical drive was successfully used by Maher El-Kady, a graduate of UCLA, to turn a specially prepared graphite oxide layer coated onto a DVD into graphene. El-Kady and Richard Kaner, his lab professor, used an unmodified LightScribe drive. The disc was prepared by coating the disc with an aqueous solution of graphite oxide and allowing it to dry. Areas of the coating illuminated by the LightScribe laser were turned into graphene. Various shapes can be drawn, which allowed the scientist duo essentially to laser-print an ultracapacitor on graphene using consumer-grade technology.

== See also ==
- DiscT@2
- LabelFlash, a similar but incompatible technology
- LabelTag
