= Wobble frequency =

Optical discs, with the exception of DVD-RAM, have their data encoded on a single spiral, or a groove, which covers the surface of the disc. In the case of recordable media, this groove is not a perfect spiral and contains a slight sinusoidal deviation (wobble) from a perfect spiral. The period of this sine curve corresponds to the wobble frequency. The wobble frequency is commonly used as a synchronization source to achieve constant linear velocity while writing a disc, but has other uses as well depending on the type of disc. The frequencies quoted all assume that the disc is being written at the '1x' speed. The frequencies are appropriately higher for faster writing speeds.

CD-R and CD-RW discs use a frequency modulated wobble with a carrier frequency of 22.05 kHz to encode information, such as the Absolute Time in Pregroove (ATIP), into the groove.

DVD-R and DVD-RW have a constant wobble frequency of 140.6 kHz relying on data 'pits' beside the groove to convey information (Land pre-pit).

DVD+R and DVD+RW have a constant wobble frequency of 817.4 kHz, but encodes its addressing information by periodically inverting the phase of the wobble signal (bi-phase modulation) to encode an exact address of the location on the spiral track (Address in Pregroove). The practical upshot of this arrangement is that the recording drive can navigate to an exact location on the DVD+R(W) disc whereas it cannot do so with the DVD-R(W).

BD-R and BD-RE discs utilise Address in Pregroove.

HD DVD-R and HD DVD-RW uses the land pre-pit system of the DVD-R(W)

== See also ==
- Absolute Time in Pregroove
- Book type
- Media Identification Code
