= Content ID =

Digital fingerprinting system by Google

- Developer: Google
- Release: 2007
- Written in: Python (backend); JavaScript (frontend)
- Platform: YouTube Services
- Included with: YouTube
- Available in: same as YouTube user interfaces
- Type: Copyright infringement and plagiarism checker; SaaS
- License: Proprietary, only accessible via YouTube

Content ID is a digital fingerprinting system developed by Google which is used to easily identify and manage copyrighted content on YouTube. Videos uploaded to YouTube are compared against audio and video files registered with Content ID by content owners, looking for any matches. Content owners have the choice to have matching content blocked or to monetize it. The system began to be implemented around 2007. By 2016, it had cost $60 million to develop and led to around $2 billion in payments to copyright holders. By 2018, Google had invested at least $100 million into the system.

== Overview ==
Content ID creates an ID File for copyrighted audio and video material, and stores it in a database. When a video is uploaded, it is checked against the database, and flagged as a copyright violation if a match is found. When this occurs, the content owner has the choice of blocking the video to make it unviewable, tracking the viewing statistics of the video, or adding advertisements to the "infringing" video with proceeds automatically going to the content owner.

Only uploaders who meet specific criteria can use Content ID. These criteria make the use of Content ID without the aid of a major backer difficult, limiting its usage to big corporations in practice.

== Context ==
Between 2007 and 2009, companies including Viacom, Mediaset, and the English Premier League filed lawsuits against YouTube, claiming that it has done too little to prevent the uploading of copyrighted material. Viacom, demanding $1 billion in damages, said that it had found more than 150,000 unauthorized clips of its material on YouTube that had been viewed "an astounding 1.5 billion times".

During the same court battle, Viacom won a court ruling requiring YouTube to hand over 12 terabytes of data detailing the viewing habits of every user who had watched videos on the site. On March 18, 2014, the lawsuit was settled after seven years with an undisclosed agreement.

== History ==
In June 2007, YouTube began trials of a system for automatic detection of uploaded videos that infringe copyright. This system uses 'digital fingerprints' of songs or videos to automatically identify their matches. More precisely, it detects the unauthorized use of copyright-protected content. Google CEO Eric Schmidt regarded this system as necessary for resolving lawsuits such as the one from Viacom, which alleged that YouTube profited from content that it did not have the right to distribute. The system was initially called "Video Identification" and later became known as Content ID. By 2010, YouTube had "already invested tens of millions of dollars in this technology". In 2011, YouTube described Content ID as "very accurate in finding uploads that look similar to reference files that are of sufficient length and quality to generate an effective ID File".

By 2012, Content ID accounted for over a third of the monetized views on YouTube.

In 2016, Google stated that Content ID had paid out around $2 billion to copyright holders (compared to around $1 billion by 2014), and had cost $60 million to develop.

In 2018, YouTube released a feature known as "Copyright Match", which was initially available to channels with more than 100,000 cumulative views. Unlike Content ID, Copyright Match is used to detect and list verbatim copies of a channel's videos that are uploaded by other YouTube users, and no action is taken until the creator chooses to do so. YouTube product manager Fabio Magagna stated that Copyright Match was derived from the Content ID system.

In 2021, YouTube recorded nearly 1.5 billion Content ID claims, including 759.5 million by the second half of the year among which 4,840 were copyright owners'.

== Use by the music industry ==
Some music rightsholders allow their music to be used in user-generated content on YouTube, with the expectation that those videos will be monetized. For example, Materia Music Publishing, a publisher of video game music, allows creators to use music administered by it in videos for non-commercial purposes, but explains that such videos will be monetized through Content ID. Materia encourages creators to dispute Content ID claims on gameplay videos. Furthermore, many independent music distributors such as DistroKid enable recording artists to add their works to Content ID provided that they meet specific criteria.

The American Society of Composers, Authors and Publishers (ASCAP) has negotiated a blanket license with YouTube, in which YouTube pays ASCAP a fee in exchange for a license to publicly perform its members' musical compositions in YouTube videos to users in the United States. About 88 percent of this licensing fee is distributed to ASCAP members. Although individual uploaders may have obtained a synchronization license to include the music in their videos, a separate public performance license is still necessary to broadcast the video online. ASCAP claims it does not block videos containing its members' musical works unless the copyright owner requests it to do so.

Nicholas T. DeLisa describes Content ID as a de facto compulsory licensing regime for user-generated content, similar to the compulsory mechanical license for cover recordings of musical works: "Every day, rights holders ratify these unlicensed uses by allowing otherwise infringing content to remain on YouTube. In other words, users can post any music they want without first obtaining a license, so long as the content owner opts in to Content ID monetization (and most have)."

== Trademark lawsuit ==
In 2006, YouTube and content protection company Audible Magic signed an agreement to mainly create 'audio identification technology', and precisely, to license the use of Audible Magic's own "Content ID" fingerprinting technology. When Google bought YouTube, in November of the same year, the license was transferred to Google. The agreement was terminated in 2009, but in 2014 Google obtained a trademark for its own "Content ID" implementation. Audible Magic sued Google the same year on the basis that they owned the "Content ID" trademark and therefore that Google trademarking their implementation was a fraud.

== Criticism ==
=== Accuracy of content fingerprinting ===
An independent test in 2009 uploaded multiple versions of the same song to YouTube, and concluded that while the system was "surprisingly resilient" in finding copyright violations in the audio tracks of videos, it was not infallible.

The music industry has criticized Content ID as inefficient, with Universal Music Publishing Group (UMPG) estimating in a 2015 filing to the US Copyright Office "that Content ID fails to identify upwards of 40 percent of the use of UMPG's compositions on YouTube". Google has countered these assertions by stating that (as of 2016) Content ID detected over 98% of known copyright infringement on YouTube and humans filing removal notices only 2%.

=== Fair use ===
The use of Content ID to remove material automatically has led to controversy in some cases, as the videos have not been checked by a human for fair use. In April 2019, WatchMojo - one of the largest YouTube channels with over 20 million subscribers and 15 billion views with an extensive library of videos that rely on fair use - released a video that relied on its 10-year experiences managing claims and strikes via Content ID to highlight instances of alleged abuse. In a follow-up video, the channel estimated that rights holders had unlawfully claimed over $2 billion from 2014 to 2019.

=== Claims on public domain material ===
Content ID has sometimes been criticized for levying false copyright claims on videos using material that is in the public domain or ineligible for copyright. In January 2018, a YouTube uploader who created a white noise generator received copyright notices about a video he uploaded which contained only white noise. In a blog post, University of North Texas copyright librarian Stephen Wolfson commented that videos of white noise may not be copyrightable because they do not pass the threshold of originality.

In September 2018, a German university professor uploaded videos with several classical music performances for which their copyright had expired. Since the composers were dead for more than 70 years, the musical compositions were in the public domain, and the recordings were no longer under copyright in Germany because they were first published before 1963. After he received several copyright violations by YouTube, he could lift the majority of them, but Deutsche Grammophon refused to lift two of them even if their copyright had expired.

=== Dispute process ===
If a YouTube user disagrees with a decision by Content ID, it is possible to fill in a form disputing the decision. However, this claim is sent directly to the party that owns the supposed copyright, who has the final decision in the matter unless legal action is pursued. If the reporting party denies their claim, the channel receives a strike. If a channel receives three strikes, it is removed from the platform. Prior to 2016, videos weren't monetized until the dispute was resolved.

Since April 2016, videos continue to be monetized while the dispute is in progress, and the money goes to whoever won the dispute. Should the uploader want to monetize the video again, they may remove the disputed audio in the "Video Manager". YouTube has cited the effectiveness of Content ID as one of the reasons why the site's rules were modified in December 2010 to allow some users to upload videos of unlimited length.

=== Fraudulent claims ===
In December 2018 TheFatRat complained that Content ID gave preference to an obvious scammer who used the automated system to claim ownership of his content and thereby steal his revenue.

On November 6, 2021, Jose Teran of Scottsdale, Arizona and his co-conspirator, Webster Batista, was charged by a federal grand jury of 30 felony counts which include Conspiracy, Wire Fraud, and Transactional Money Laundering. Teran, in pleading guilty, admitted that they created the fake music publishing company MediaMuv L.L.C. from which they claimed 50,000 songs and received royalty payments amounting to $20,776,517.31 using YouTube's Content ID System. On June 26, 2023, Teran was sentenced to 70 months in prison by Judge Douglas L. Rayes. According to the U. S. Attorney's Office, District of Arizona, the case has been dubbed as "one of the largest music-royalty frauds ever perpetrated."

=== Impact of system changes ===
In December 2013, Google changed the way the system worked (seemingly to cover YouTube in case of lawsuits), leading to numerous content creation copyright notices being sent to YouTube accounts. Those notices led to ad revenues being automatically diverted to third parties, which sometimes had no connection to the games.

== See also ==
- Acoustic fingerprint
- EU Directive on Copyright in the Digital Single Market
- Fingerprint (computing)
- Media Identification Code (MID)
