= Absolute Time in Pregroove =

Information storage method

Absolute Time in Pregroove (ATIP) is a method of storing information on an optical medium, used on CD-R and CD-RW. ATIP information is only readable on CD-R and CD-RW drives, as read-only drives do not need the information stored on it. The information indicates if the disk is writable and information needed to correctly write to the disk.

== Usage ==
ATIP is used as a method of putting data on an optical medium, specifically:

- Manufacturer
- Writable/Rewritable
- Dye type
- Spiral length in blocks
- Rated speed
- Audio

These features are rather important to the function as it lets the drive know if it is writable. If the disc is re-writable, and the ATIP is damaged, it will not be able to write more than once. Also, it lets the drive know what the maximum write speed available for the disc is, and how much space (in blocks) the disc holds.

=== Disc Application Code ===
Within the ATIP data is a 7-bit field called Disc Application Code which determines if a disc is a standard CD-R or a "Music CD-R". This is used to enforce a private copying levy on CD-Rs for use in consumer audio CD recorders. Consumer audio CD recorders will not allow recording audio onto a CD-R disc without this value set. This does not affect computer CD burners or professional CD audio recorders.

== Function ==
Every writable disc has at least four layers:

- Disc substrate – the bulk of the disc is 1.2 mm thick, and is usually injection molded from polycarbonate plastic.
- Recording layer – a thin coating of dye on recordable discs, or a sandwich of metals for rewriteable discs.
- Reflective layer – a thin layer of silver, a silver alloy, or gold.
- Protective coating – a clear lacquer which is spin-coated over the top of the disc and cured with ultraviolet light.

The polycarbonate layer has a spiral pre-groove that is formed when the disc substrate is injection molded against a stamper. The read/write laser in the drive will follow this pre-groove track as it is writing, in order to maintain the spacing between the written tracks with a high degree of accuracy.

The groove on the surface of a CD-R disc is not a perfect spiral and contains slight sinusoidal deviations called wobble. Frequency modulation is used to encode data into the wobble with a carrier frequency of 22.05 kHz. The drive will synchronize its rotation speed to the reference speed of the wobble signal, allowing it to maintain an accurate linear velocity (the speed of the track as it passes the laser). This wobble is further modulated with a timecode reference signal allowing the drive to approximately locate specific blocks of data on the disc. This modulated signal is known as ATIP.

== See also ==
- Media Identification Code
- Compact Disc subcode
