= Labelflash =

Printing technology that writes labels onto special optical discs

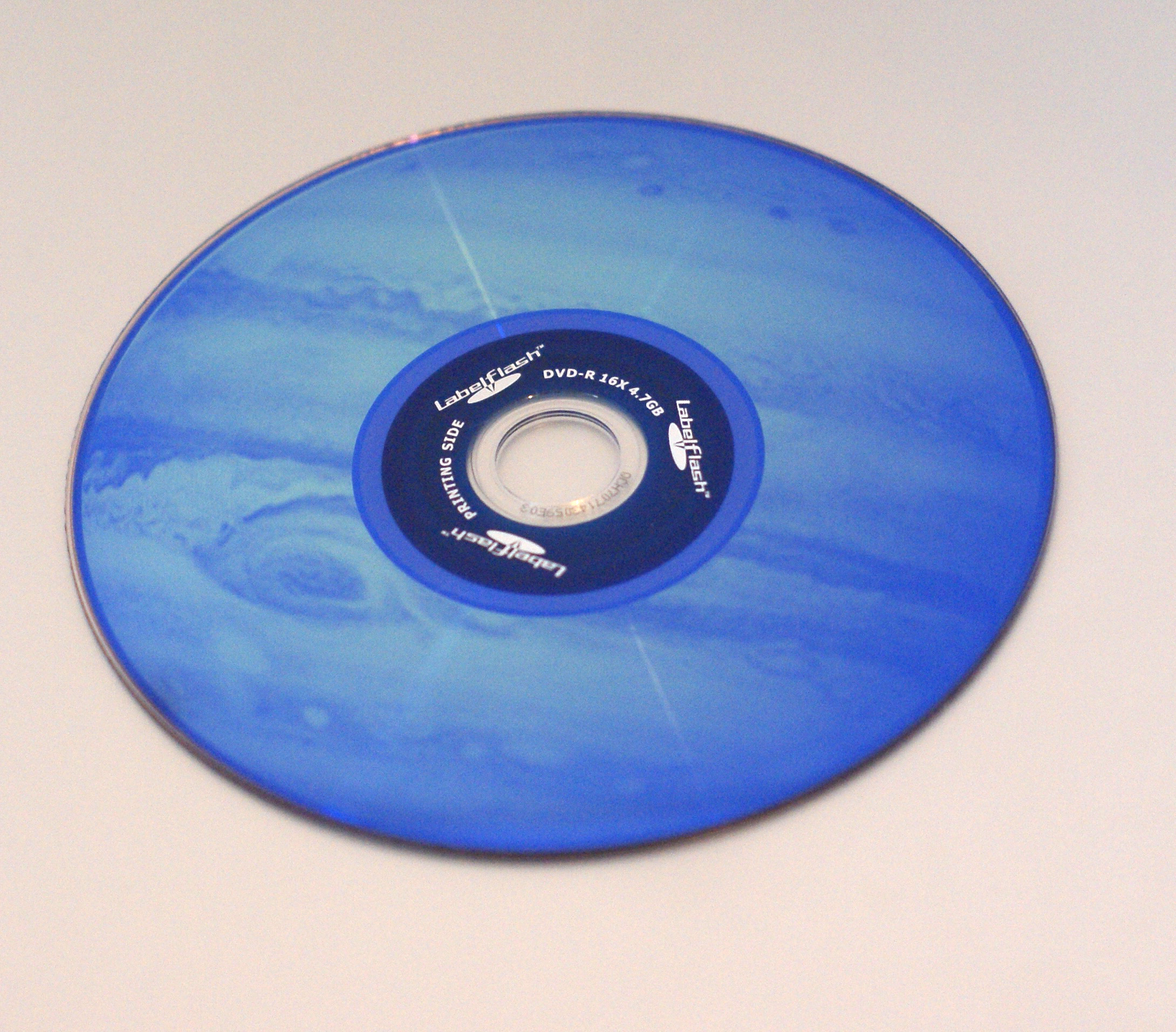
A Labelflash disc engraved with an image of the planet Jupiter.

Labelflash (sometimes written LabelFlash) is a technology which allows users to burn custom designs or images onto proprietary DVD media first announced in October 2005 as a collaboration between Yamaha and Fujifilm. While Yamaha developed the optical drives, Fujifilm manufactured the proprietary Labelflash optical discs. NEC manufactured the first Labelflash compatible drive, the ND4551, which was released in December 2005.

Burning Labelflash media is supported by Nero Burning ROM version 7 and newer. Yamaha partnered with Toshiba and Gateway to provide Labelflash as a feature in computers made by those companies.

Production of Labelflash media was halted on December 22, 2016. Labelflash was officially discontinued in 2017.

== Technical details ==
In Labelflash, the standard recording head of an optical drive is repurposed to burn images onto a layer of dye made for this purpose on the top of proprietary Labelflash optical media. The dye is 0.6mm below the surface so as to protect it from the elements.

The resolution is adjustable between 300 and 1800 dpi (dots per inch). Up to 256 monochromatic shades can be used in the image. The labeling process takes 7 minutes at the lowest resolution and a half hour at the highest. Labelflash is backwards compatible with Yamaha's earlier DiscT@2 technology—this allows Labelflash-compatible optical drives to engrave onto the data side of discs as well.

According to Yamaha, a new iteration of Labelflash which supported four color printing was in the works—however, as Labelflash support was discontinued in 2017, this never came to fruition.

== Reception ==
The technology is often compared with Hewlett-Packard's LightScribe, released one year earlier. After its release, Labelflash was not available in the United States until 2007, giving HP a three-year head start in the US market. Furthermore, worldwide, proprietary Labelflash optical media cost double that of comparable LightScribe media, at US$2.40 per disc, which Tom's Hardware called an "exorbitant" price that made printing "painful" as test prints were not worth doing. Commenting on the price, Engadget's Marc Perton said he'd "stick with [his] Sharpie for now."

Reviewers, such as Gordon Laing for Personal Computer World, also noted that when compared to LightScribe, Labelflash images looked more "unnatural" and less "vibrant".

== See also ==
- DiscT@2
- LabelTag
- LightScribe
