= CD-R =

Recordable optical disc specification

Compact disc-recordable

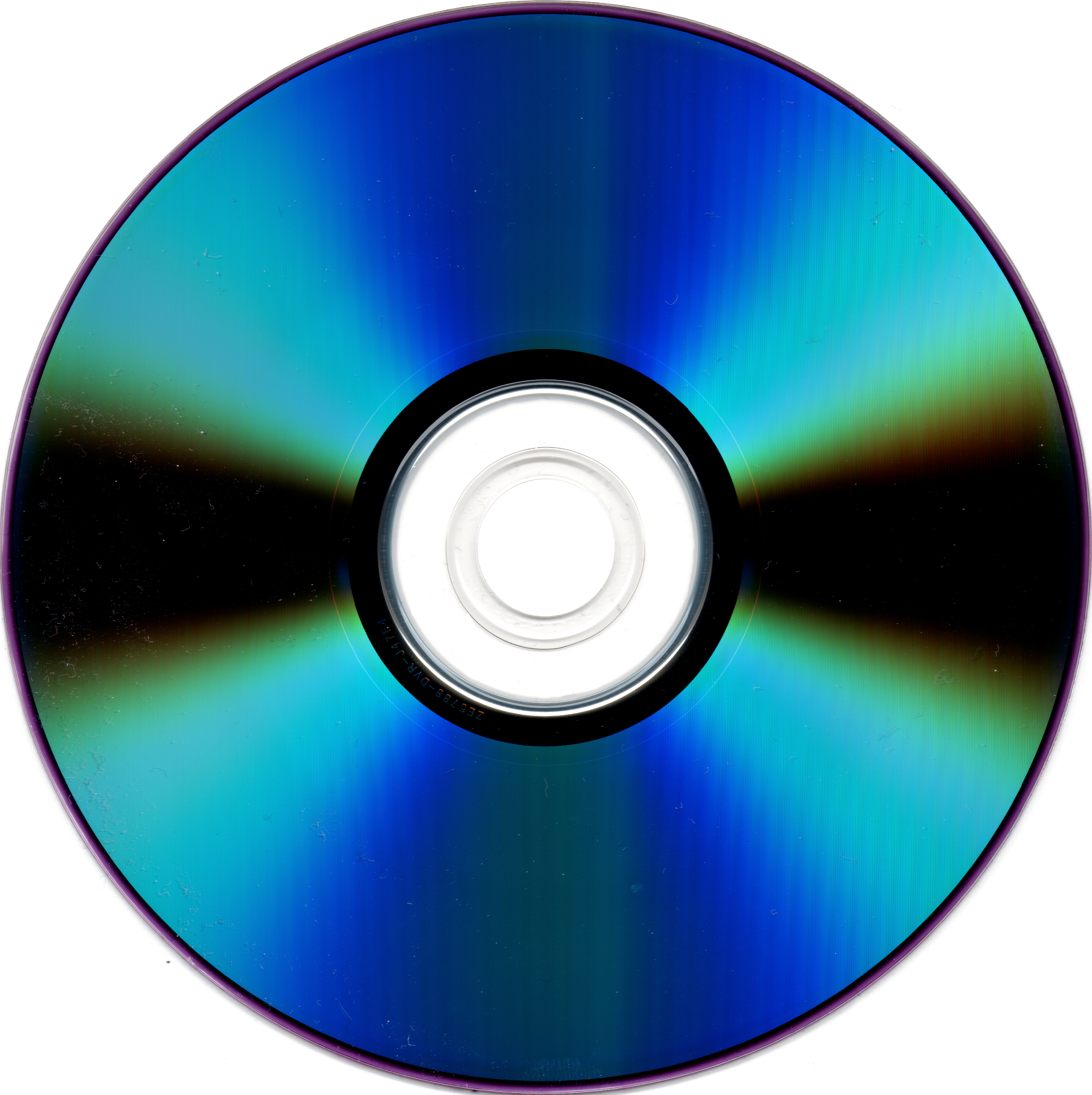
- Media type: Optical disc
- Encoding: Various
- Capacity: Typically up to 700 MB (up to 80 minutes audio)
- Read mechanism: 600–780 nm wavelength (infrared and red edge) semiconductor laser, 1,200 kbit/s (1×) to 100 Mb/s (56×)
- Write mechanism: 780 nm wavelength (infrared and red edge) semiconductor laser
- Standard: Rainbow Books
- Developed by: Philips, Sony
- Usage: Audio and data storage
- Extended from: Recordable LaserDisc; CD-ROM
- Extended to: CD-RW; DVD-R
- Released: 1988; 38 years ago

CD-R (Compact disc-recordable) is a digital optical disc storage format. A CD-R disc is a compact disc that can only be written once and read arbitrarily many times.

CD-R discs (CD-Rs) are readable by most CD readers manufactured prior to the introduction of CD-R, unlike CD-RW discs.

== History ==
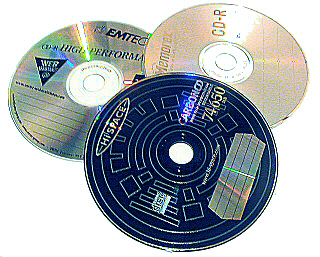
Assorted CD-Rs

Originally named CD Write-Once (CD-WO), the CD-R format is specified in Part II of the Orange Book by Philips and Sony. Taiyo Yuden produced the first CD-R media in 1988, sold under the brand name That's CD-R. The Orange Book consists of several parts covering the CD-WO, CD-MO (magneto-optic), and later CD-RW (rewritable). The latest editions have abandoned the use of the term CD-WO in favor of CD-R, while CD-MO was rarely used. Written CD-Rs and CD-RWs are, in the aspect of low-level encoding and data format, fully compatible with the audio CD (Red Book CD-DA) and data CD (Yellow Book CD-ROM) standards. The Yellow Book standard for CD-ROM only specifies a high-level data format and refers to the Red Book for all physical format and low-level code details, such as track pitch, linear bit density, and bitstream encoding. This means they use Eight-to-Fourteen Modulation, CIRC error correction, and, for CD-ROM, the third error correction layer defined in the Yellow Book.

Properly written CD-R discs on blanks of less than 80 minutes in length are fully compatible with the audio CD and CD-ROM standards in all details, including physical specifications. 80-minute CD-R discs marginally violate the Red Book physical format specifications, and longer discs are non-compliant. CD-RW discs have lower reflectivity than CD-R or pressed (non-writable) CDs, and for this reason cannot meet the Red Book standard. Some hardware compatible with Red Book CDs may have difficulty reading CD-Rs and, because of their lower reflectivity, especially CD-RWs. To the extent that CD hardware can read extended-length discs or CD-RW discs, it is because that hardware has capability beyond the minimum required by the Red Book and Yellow Book standards (the hardware is more capable than it needs to be to bear the Compact Disc logo).

CD-R recording systems available in 1990 were similar to the washing machine-sized Meridian CD Publisher, based on the two-piece rack mount Yamaha PDS audio recorder costing $35,000, not including the required external ECC circuitry for data encoding, SCSI hard drive subsystem, and MS-DOS control computer.

On July 3, 1991, the first recording of a concert directly to CD was made using a Yamaha YPDR 601. The concert was performed by Claudio Baglioni at the Stadio Flaminio in Rome, Italy.

By 1992, the cost of typical recorders was down to $10,000–12,000, and in September 1995, Hewlett-Packard introduced its model 4020i manufactured by Philips, which, at $995, was the first recorder to cost less than $1,000. As of the 2010s, devices capable of writing to CD-Rs and other types of writable CDs could be found for under $20.

The dye materials developed by Taiyo Yuden made it possible for CD-R discs to be compatible with Audio CD and CD-ROM discs.

By the 2010s, USB flash drives, memory cards, and online storage had displaced recordable optical media for most everyday use. In June 2024 Sony, a co-developer of the format, said it would phase out production of recordable optical discs, including CD-R, at its plant in Tagajō, Japan, cutting about 250 jobs and citing falling demand and the shift to streaming.

== Music CD-Rs ==
In the United States, there is a market separation between "music" CD-Rs and "data" CD-Rs, the former being notably more expensive than the latter due to industry copyright arrangements with the RIAA. Specifically, the price of every music CD-R includes a mandatory royalty disbursed to RIAA members by the disc manufacturer; this grants the disc an "application flag" indicating that the royalty has been paid. Consumer standalone music recorders refuse to burn CD-Rs that are missing this flag. Professional CD recorders are not subject to this restriction and can record music to discs with or without the flag. The two types of discs are functionally and physically identical other than this, and computer CD burners can record data and/or music to either. New music CD-Rs are still being manufactured as of the late 2010s, although demand for them has declined as CD-based music recorders have been supplanted by other devices incorporating the same or similar functionality.

The groove on the surface of a CD-R disc is not a perfect spiral and contains slight sinusoidal deviations called wobble. Frequency modulation is used to encode data into the wobble with a carrier frequency of 22.05 kHz. This method of storing information is called Absolute Time in Pregroove (ATIP). Within the ATIP data is a 7-bit field called Disc Application Code containing bits U1 through U7. The first bit, U1, is used to determine if a CD-R is considered a "music" CD-R.

=== U1 bit values ===
U1 bit value	Definition	Writable by Professional CD-recorder?	Writable by Consumer CD-recorder?
0	Discs for restricted use	Yes	No
1	Discs for unrestricted use	Yes	Yes

== Physical characteristics ==
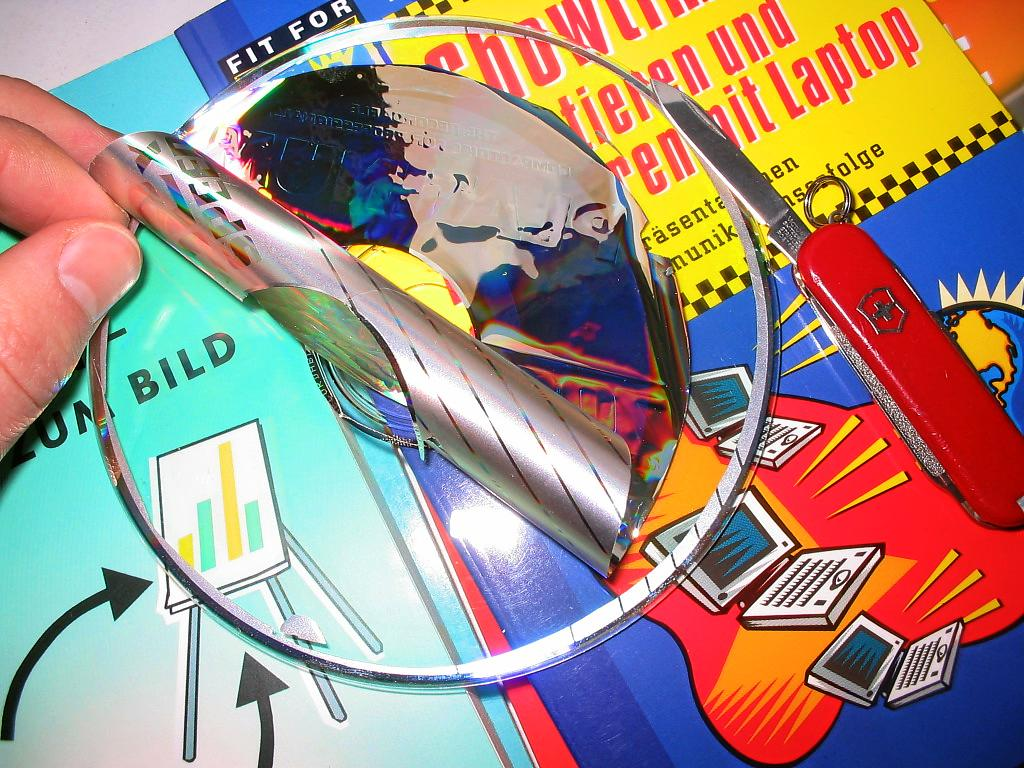
Isolated data layer of a CD-R

This graphic demonstrates some of the visible features of a CD-R, including the lead-in, program area, and lead-out. A microscopic spiral of digital information begins near the disc's center and progresses toward the edge. The end of the data region and the lead-out can actually be anywhere, depending on how much data is recorded. Data-free areas of the disc and silent portions of the spiral reflect light differently, sometimes allowing track boundaries to be seen

A standard CD-R is a 1.2 mm (0.047 in) thick disc made of polycarbonate about 120 mm (5") in diameter. The 120 mm (5") disc has a storage capacity of 74 minutes of audio or 650 megabytes (MB) of data. CD-R/RWs are available with capacities of 80 minutes of audio or 737,280,000 bytes (703.125 MiB), which they achieve by molding the disc at the tightest allowable tolerances specified in the Orange Book CD-R/CD-RW standards. The engineering margin reserved for manufacturing tolerance is used for data capacity instead, leaving little margin for manufacturing variation.

Despite the foregoing, most CD-Rs on the market have an 80-minute capacity. There are also 90-minute/790 MB and 99-minute/870 MB discs, although they are less common and depart from the Orange Book standard. Due to the limitations of the data structures in the ATIP, 90- and 99-minute blanks will identify as 80-minute ones. As the ATIP is part of the Orange Book standard, its design does not support some nonstandard disc configurations. In order to use the additional capacity, these discs have to be burned using overburn options in the CD recording software. Overburning itself is so named because it is outside the written standards, but, due to market demand, it has nonetheless become a de facto standard function in most CD writing drives and software for them.

Some drives use special techniques, such as Plextor's GigaRec or Sanyo's HD-BURN, to write more data onto a given disc; these techniques are deviations from the compact disc (Red, Yellow, and/or Orange Book) standards, making the recorded discs proprietary-formatted and not fully compatible with standard CD players and drives. In certain applications where discs will not be distributed or exchanged outside a private group and will not be archived for a long time, a proprietary format may be an acceptable way to obtain greater capacity (up to 1.2 GB with GigaRec or 1.8 GB with HD-BURN on 99-minute media). The greatest risk in using such a proprietary data storage format, assuming that it works reliably as designed, is that it may be difficult or impossible to repair or replace the hardware used to read the media if it fails, is damaged, or is lost after its original vendor discontinues it.

Discs with capacities larger than 650 MB, and especially those larger than 700 MB, are less interchangeable among drives than standard discs and are less suitable for archival use, because their readability on other or future equipment is not assured.

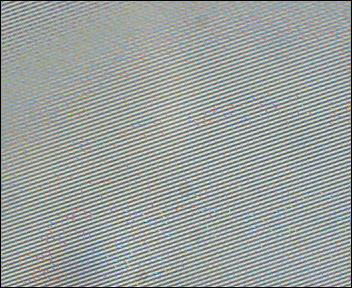
Photomicrograph of the groove in a CD-R disc

The polycarbonate disc contains a spiral groove, called the pregroove because it is molded in before data are written to the disc; it guides the laser beam upon writing and reading information. The pregroove is molded into the top side of the polycarbonate disc, where the pits and lands would be molded if it were a pressed, nonrecordable Red Book CD. The bottom side, which faces the laser beam in the player or drive, is flat and smooth. The polycarbonate disc is coated on the pregroove side with a very thin layer of organic dye. Then, on top of the dye is coated a thin, reflecting layer of silver, a silver alloy, or gold. Finally, a protective coating of a photo-polymerizable lacquer is applied on top of the metal reflector and cured with UV light.

A blank CD-R is not "empty"; the pregroove has a wobble (the ATIP), which helps the writing laser to stay on track and to write the data to the disc at a constant rate. Maintaining a constant rate is essential to ensure the proper size and spacing of the pits and lands burned into the dye layer. As well as providing timing information, the ATIP (absolute time in pregroove) is also a data track containing information about the CD-R manufacturer, the dye used, and media information (disc length and so on). The pregroove is not destroyed when the data are written to the CD-R, a point which some copy protection schemes use to distinguish copies from an original CD.

=== Dyes ===
There are three basic formulations of dye used in CD-Rs:

1. Cyanine dye CD-Rs were the earliest ones developed, and their formulation is patented by Taiyo Yuden. CD-Rs based on this dye are mostly green in color. The earlier models were very chemically unstable and this made cyanine-based discs unsuitable for archival use; they could fade and become unreadable in a few years. Many manufacturers like Taiyo Yuden use proprietary chemical additives, typically a metal atom bonded to the cyanine molecule, to make more stable cyanine discs ("metal-stabilized Cyanine", "Super Cyanine"). Older cyanine dye-based CD-Rs, as well as all the hybrid dyes based on cyanine, are very sensitive to UV-rays and can become unreadable after only a few days if they were exposed to direct sunlight. Although the additives used have made cyanine more stable, it is still the most sensitive of the dyes in UV rays (showing signs of degradation within a week of direct sunlight exposure). A common mistake users make is to leave the CD-Rs with the "clear" (recording) surface upwards, in order to protect it from scratches, as this lets the sun hit the recording surface directly.
2. Phthalocyanine dye CD-Rs are usually silver, gold, or light green. The patents on phthalocyanine CD-Rs are held by Mitsui and Ciba Specialty Chemicals. Phthalocyanine is a natively stable dye (has no need for stabilizers) and CD-Rs based on this are often given a rated lifetime of hundreds of years. Unlike cyanine, phthalocyanine is more resistant to UV rays, and CD-Rs based on this dye show signs of degradation only after two weeks of direct sunlight exposure. However, phthalocyanine is more sensitive than cyanine to writing laser power calibration, meaning that the power level used by the writing laser has to be more accurately adjusted for the disc in order to get a good recording; this may erode the benefits of dye stability, as marginally written discs (with higher correctable error rates) will lose data (i.e. have uncorrectable errors) after less dye degradation than well-written discs (with lower correctable error rates).
3. Azo dye CD-Rs are dark blue in color, and their formulation is patented by Mitsubishi Chemical Corporation. Azo dyes are also chemically stable, and Azo CD-Rs are typically rated with a lifetime of decades. Azo is the most resistant dye against UV light and begins to degrade only after the third or fourth week of direct sunlight exposure. More modern implementations of this kind of dye include Super Azo which is not as deep blue as the earlier Metal Azo. This change of composition was necessary in order to achieve higher writing speeds.

There are many hybrid variations of the dye formulations, such as Formazan by Kodak (a hybrid of cyanine and phthalocyanine).

Many manufacturers have added additional coloring to disguise their unstable cyanine CD-Rs in the past, so the formulation of a disc cannot be determined based purely on its color. Similarly, a gold reflective layer does not guarantee the use of phthalocyanine dye. The quality of the disc is also not only dependent on the dye used, it is also influenced by sealing, the top layer, the reflective layer, and the polycarbonate. Simply choosing a disc based on its dye type may be problematic. Furthermore, correct power calibration of the laser in the writer, as well as correct timing of the laser pulses, stable disc speed, and so on, is critical to not only the immediate readability but the longevity of the recorded disc, so for archiving it is important to have not only a high-quality disc but a high-quality writer. In fact, a high-quality writer may produce adequate results with medium-quality media, but high-quality media cannot compensate for a mediocre writer, and discs written by such a writer cannot achieve their maximum potential archival lifetime.

== Speed ==
Data writing speed	Data writing rate	Write time for 80 minute/700 MB CD-R
1×	150 kB/s	80 minutes
2×	300 kB/s	40 minutes
4×	600 kB/s	20 minutes
8×	1.2 MB/s	10 minutes
12×	1.8 MB/s	7 minutes
16×	2.4 MB/s	5 minutes
20×	3.0 MB/s	4 minutes
24×	3.6 MB/s	3.4 minutes (see below)
32×	4.8 MB/s	2.5 minutes (see below)
40×	6.0 MB/s	2 minutes (see below)
48×	7.2 MB/s	1.7 minutes (see below)
52×	7.8 MB/s	1.5 minutes (see below)

These times only include the actual optical writing pass over the disc. For most disc recording operations, additional time is used for overhead processes, such as organizing the files and tracks, which adds to the theoretical minimum total time required to produce a disc. (An exception might be making a disc from a prepared ISO image, for which the overhead would likely be trivial.) At the lowest write speeds, this overhead takes so much less time than the actual disc writing pass that it may be negligible, but at higher write speeds, the overhead time becomes a larger proportion of the overall time taken to produce a finished disc and may add significantly to it.

Also, above 20× speed, drives use a Zoned-CLV or CAV strategy, where the advertised maximum speed is only reached near the outer rim of the disc. This is not taken into account by the above table. (If this were not done, the faster rotation that would be required at the inner tracks could cause the disc to fracture and/or could cause excessive vibration which would make accurate and successful writing impossible.)

== Writing methods ==
The blank disc has a pre-groove track onto which the data are written. The pre-groove track, which also contains timing information, ensures that the recorder follows the same spiral path as a conventional CD. A CD recorder writes data to a CD-R disc by pulsing its laser to heat areas of the organic dye layer. The writing process does not produce indentations (pits); instead, the heat permanently changes the optical properties of the dye, changing the reflectivity of those areas. Using a low power laser, so as not to further alter the dye, the disc is read back in the same way as a CD-ROM. However, the reflected light is modulated not by pits, but by the alternating regions of heated and unaltered dye. The change of the intensity of the reflected laser radiation is transformed into an electrical signal, from which the digital information is recovered ("decoded"). Once a section of a CD-R is written, it cannot be erased or rewritten, unlike a CD-RW. A CD-R can be recorded in multiple sessions. A CD recorder can write to a CD-R using several methods including:

1. Disc At Once – the whole CD-R is written in one session with no gaps and the disc is "closed" meaning no more data can be added and the CD-R effectively becomes a standard read-only CD. With no gaps between the tracks, the Disc At Once format is useful for "live" audio recordings.
2. Track At Once – data are written to the CD-R one track at a time but the CD is left "open" for further recording at a later stage. It also allows data and audio to reside on the same CD-R.
3. Packet Writing – used to record data to a CD-R in "packets", allowing extra information to be appended to a disc at a later time, or for information on the disc to be made "invisible". In this way, CD-R can emulate CD-RW; however, each time information on the disc is altered, more data has to be written to the disc. There can be compatibility issues with this format and some CD drives.

With careful examination, the written and unwritten areas can be distinguished by the naked eye. CD-Rs are written from the center outwards, so the written area appears as an inner band with slightly different shading.

CDs have a Power Calibration Area, used to calibrate the writing laser before and during recording. CDs contain two such areas: one close to the inner edge of the disc, for low-speed calibration, and another on the outer edge on the disc, for high-speed calibration. The calibration results are recorded on a Recording Management Area (RMA) that can hold up to 99 calibrations. The disc cannot be written after the RMA is full, however, the RMA may be emptied in CD-RW discs.

=== Formatting CD-R into CD-ROM ===
Choosing a finalize disc or close disc option during a burn setup, it will no longer accept any future writes, and become read-only.

== Lifespan ==
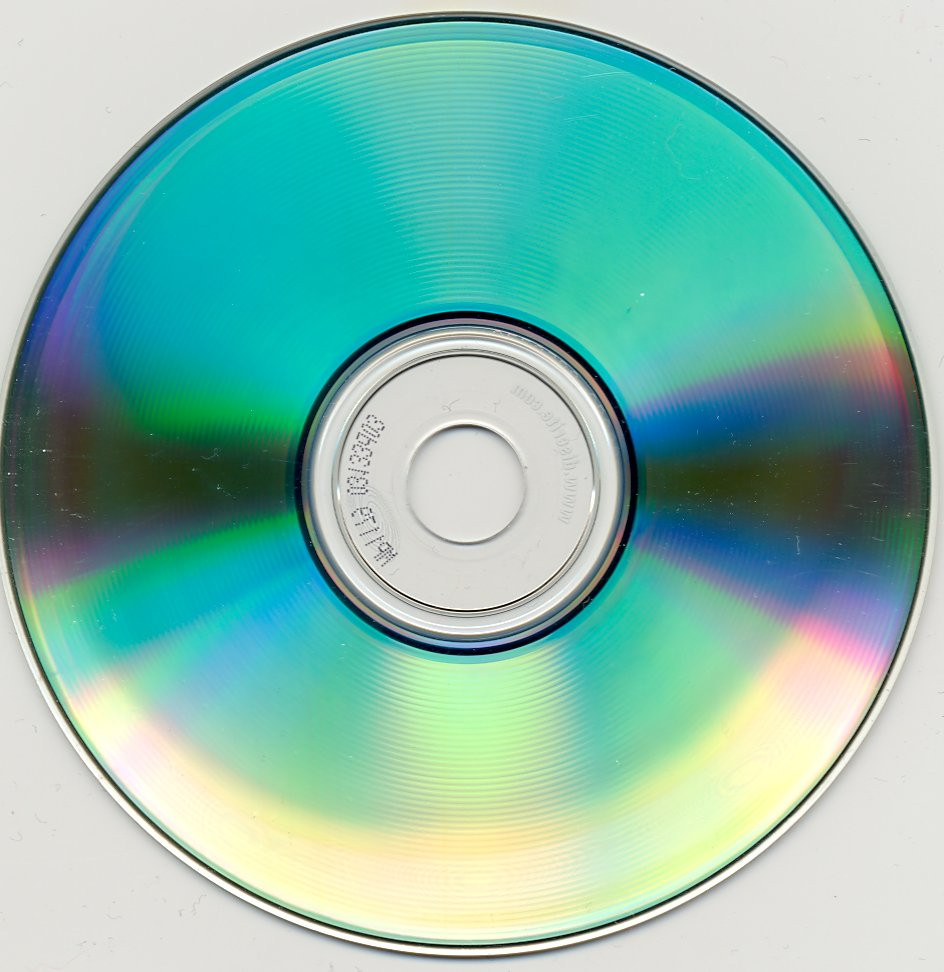
An example of a CD-R burned in 2000 showing dye degradation in 2008. Part of the data on it has been lost.

Real-life (not accelerated aging) tests have revealed that some CD-Rs degrade quickly even if stored normally. The quality of a CD-R disc has a large and direct influence on longevity; low-quality discs should not be expected to last very long. According to research conducted by J. Perdereau, CD-Rs are expected to have an average life expectancy of 10 years. Branding is not a reliable guide to quality, because many brands (major as well as no name) do not manufacture their own discs. Instead, they are sourced from different manufacturers of varying quality. For best results, the actual manufacturer and material components of each batch of discs should be verified.

Burned CD-Rs suffer from material degradation, just like most writable media. CD-R media have an internal layer of dye used to store data. In a CD-RW disc, the recording layer is made of an alloy of silver and other metals: indium, antimony, and tellurium. In CD-R media, the dye itself can degrade, causing data to become unreadable.

As well as degradation of the dye, failure of a CD-R can be due to the reflective surface. While silver is less expensive and more widely used, it is more prone to oxidation, resulting in a non-reflecting surface. Gold, on the other hand, although more expensive and no longer widely used, is an inert material, so gold-based CD-Rs do not suffer from this problem. Manufacturers have estimated the longevity of gold-based CD-Rs to be as high as 100 years.

By measuring the rate of correctable data errors, the data integrity and/or manufacturing quality of CD-R media can be measured, allowing for a reliable prediction of future data losses caused by media degradation.

== Labeling ==
It is recommended if using adhesive-backed paper labels that the labels be specially made for CD-Rs. A balanced CD vibrates only slightly when rotated at high speed. Bad or improperly made labels, or labels applied off-center, unbalance the CD and can cause it to vibrate when it spins, which causes read errors and even risks damaging the drive.

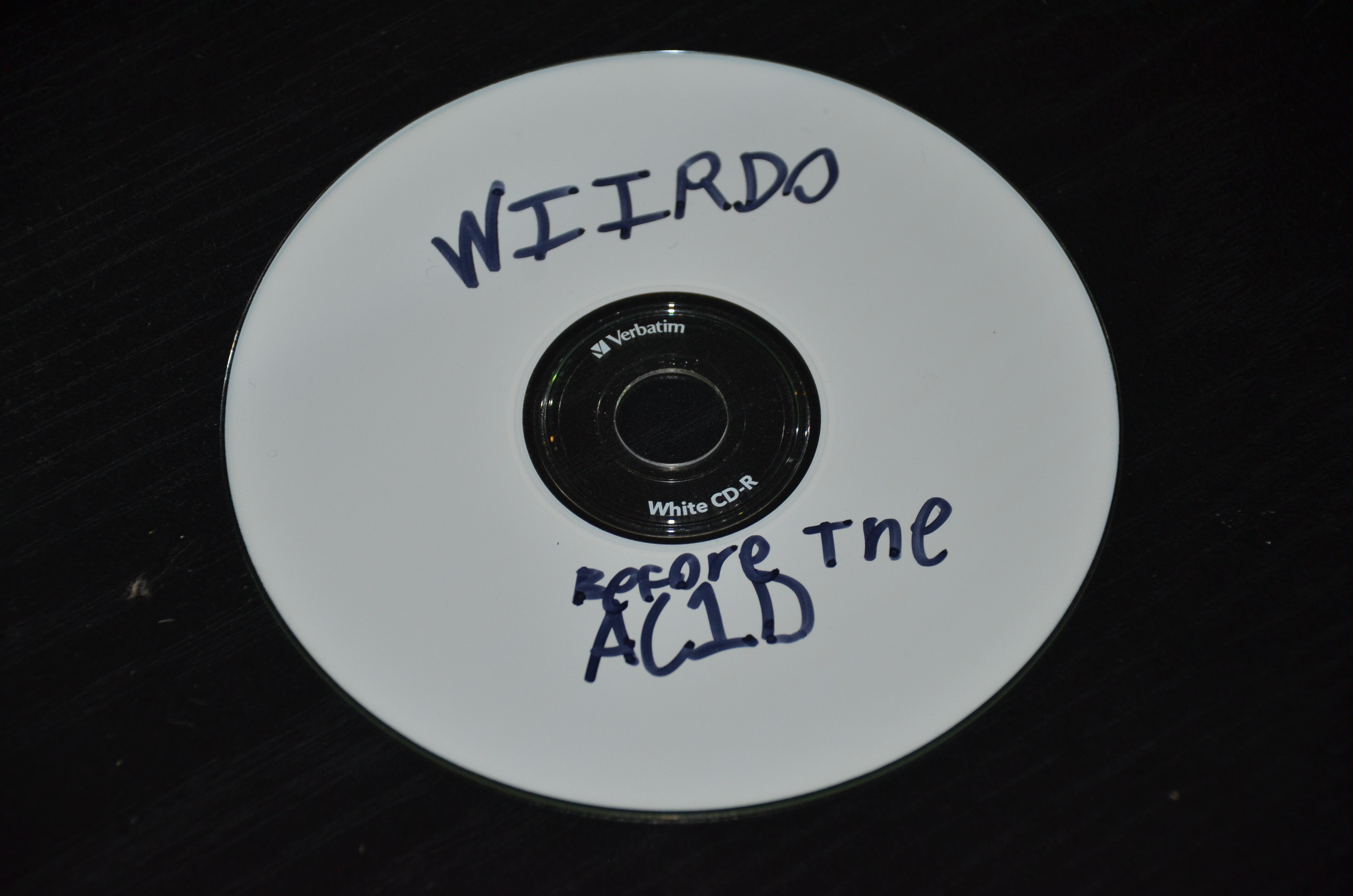
Example of burned CD-R labeled using a permanent marker.

A professional alternative to CD labels is pre-printed CDs using a 5-color silkscreen or offset press. Using a permanent marker pen is also a common practice. However, solvents from such pens can affect the dye layer.

== Disposal ==
=== Data confidentiality ===
Since CD-Rs, in general, cannot be logically erased to any degree, the disposal of CD-Rs presents a possible security issue if they contain sensitive/private data. Destroying the data requires physically destroying the disc or data layer. Heating the disc in a microwave oven for 10–15 seconds effectively destroys the data layer by causing arcing in the metal reflective layer, but this same arcing may cause damage or excessive wear to the microwave oven. Many office paper shredders are also designed to shred CDs.

Some recent burners (Plextor, LiteOn) support erase operations on -R media, by "overwriting" the stored data with strong laser power, although the erased area cannot be overwritten with new data.

=== Recycling ===
The polycarbonate material and possible gold or silver in the reflective layer would make CD-Rs highly recyclable. However, the polycarbonate is of very little value and the quantity of precious metals is so small that it is not profitable to recover them. Consequently, recyclers that accept CD-Rs typically do not offer compensation for donating or transporting the materials.

== See also ==
- Absolute Time in Pregroove
- Blu-ray Disc
- CD recorder
- CD-R caddy
- CD-ROM, GD-ROM
- CD-RW, DVD-RW
- DVD, DVD-R, DVD+R, DVD+R DL
- HD DVD
- Labelflash
- LightScribe
- MIL-CD
- MultiLevel Recording, an obsolete technology (with non-binary modulation)
- Optical disc authoring
- Rainbow Books
- Thor-CD, a comparable effort by Tandy Corporation to develop rewritable CD technology
- List of optical disc manufacturers
