= CDemu =

Open source virtual drive software

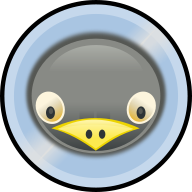
- Developer(s): The CDemu project
- Stable release: 3.2.5 / April 23, 2021; 4 years ago
- Written in: C and Python with GTK
- Operating system: Linux
- Available in: 7 languages
- Type: Virtual drive
- License: GNU GPLv2
- Website: cdemu.sourceforge.io

CDemu is a free and open-source virtual drive software, designed to emulate an optical drive and optical disc (including CD-ROMs and DVD-ROMs) on the Linux operating system.

As of 30 June 2019, CDemu is not available in the official repositories of Debian, Ubuntu and Fedora Linux for any release, but it is available via official PPA for Ubuntu and COPR for Fedora Linux.

== Components ==
CDEmu consists of:

- a kernel module implementing a virtual SCSI host bus adapter,
- libmirage which is a software library for interpreting optical disc images,
- a daemon which emulates the functionality of a SCSI optical drive+disc,
- textmode and GTK clients for controlling the emulator.

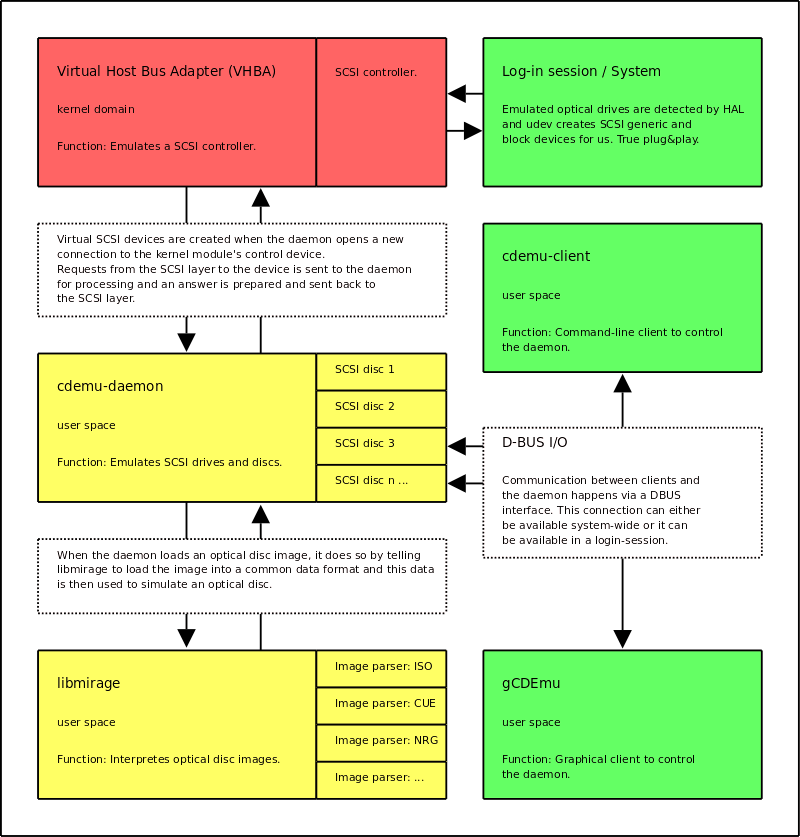
CDEmu functionality

The software is portable to other operating systems supported by GLib, with the exceptions of the kernel module and the clients which rely on d-bus communication.

== History ==
CDemu was originally designed by Robert Penz and Justus Schwartz as a patch for MPlayer that allowed mounting .CUE/.BIN files. After the patch was completed, they realized the simplicity, and wrote a module for Linux kernel.

Originally, CDemu was named Virtual CD, but this name had been previously trademarked, and the owners of the trademark requested that they not use the name.

As of June, 2007, development on CDemu 0.8 ceased and a rewrite was developed instead. Most of this work was done by Rok Mandeljc. This new version of CDemu took another approach to the emulation by doing as much as possible in userspace. As of June 2008 it is considered to be mostly stable.

== Status ==
As of version 2.0.0 CDemu supports the following image formats:

- .mds and .mdx format
- .dmg and .cdr format
- Blindwrite .b5t/.b6t format
- DiscJuggler's .cdi format
- Easy CD Creator .cif format
- Roxio / WinOnCD .c2d format
- Error Code Modeller .ecm container format
- gBurner .gbi format
- .iso format and its compressed forms, .cso and .isz
- .nrg format
- PowerISO .daa format
- .udf format
- Raw images (.img, .bin, .ccd, .cue, .sub and .toc)
- GZip and Xz archives

The emulator endeavors to follow the MMC-3 standard for SCSI optical drives as closely as possible, ensuring realistic and accurate emulation.

Optical media emulated by CDemu can be mounted within Linux.

CDemu has the support for CD subchannels, CD-Text, ISRC，MCN and ECC/EDC, DPM/RMPS. There is also some support for a limited number of encrypted and compressed image formats.

The developers are working on supporting as many major formats as they can, and they encourage users to submit patches to this end.

== See also ==
Alternative Linux programs that are available in the repositories of Debian, Ubuntu and Fedora Linux:

- AcetoneISO
