= Alcohol 120% =

Optical disc authoring software

- The Image Making Wizard in Alcohol 120% (v2.1 in Windows 10)
- Developer: Alcohol Soft
- Initial release: October 2002; 23 years ago
- Stable release: 2.1.1.2201 / January 7, 2023; 2 years ago
- Operating system: Microsoft Windows
- Type: Disc image emulator
- License: Shareware
- Website: alcohol-soft.com

Alcohol 120% is a disk image emulator and disc burning software for Microsoft Windows developed by Alcohol Soft. An edition named Alcohol 52% is also offered which lacks the burning engine. The software can create image files from a source CD/DVD/Blu-ray, as well as mount them in virtual drives, all in the proprietary Media Descriptor File format; images in this format consist of a pair of .mds and .mdf files.

== Features ==
Alcohol 120%'s image recording feature is capable of bypassing certain copy protection schemes, such as SafeDisc, SecuROM, and Data Position Measurement (DPM). However, certain copy protection schemes require burner hardware that is capable of reproducing the copy protection. It can also create images of PlayStation and PlayStation 2 file systems. It lacks the ability to back up DVD titles encrypted with the Content Scramble System. Due to legal restrictions, Alcohol Soft has opted not to include this feature.

Some software manufacturers employ software blacklisting methods to prevent Alcohol 120% from copying their discs. Initially, users had to use third-party tools to counteract the blacklisting, such as Anti-blaxx, CureROM, and Y.A.S.U. Later, Alcohol 120% included its own "Alcohol Cloaking Initiative for DRM" (A.C.I.D) component.

Alcohol Soft has cited it will not be developing an image editor for Alcohol 120%.

The latest versions of Alcohol 120% comes with "Alcohol Cloaking Initiative for DRM" (A.C.I.D), which hides emulated drives from SecuROM 7 and SafeDisc 4.

=== Formats supported ===
Alcohol 120%'s image making tool supports the following formats:

- Media Descriptor File (default), consisting of a pair of .mds and .mdf
- ISO image (.iso)

It also supports burning in many formats.

Supported file formats for image mounting
File types	Details
.b5t	BlindWrite
.b6t	BlindWrite
.bwt, .bwi, .bws	BlindWrite
.ccd + .img + .sub	CloneCD
.cdi	DiscJuggler
.bin + .cue	CDRWIN
.iso	ISO image
.isz	Compressed ISO image
.mds + .mdf	Media Descriptor Image
.nrg, .nri	Nero Burning ROM
.pdi	Instant Copy

== Other editions ==
- Alcohol 52% is a version of Alcohol 120% without the burning engine. It can still create image files, and mount those images on up to 31 virtual drives. There are two versions of Alcohol 52%, free and 30-day trial. The free version contains an optional adware toolbar bundled and is limited to 6 virtual drives.
- Alcohol 68% is a version of Alcohol 120% without media emulation capabilities, providing only the CD/DVD burning functions. It has since been discontinued and integrated into Alcohol 120%.
- Alcohol 120% Free Edition is a free for non-commercial use version of Alcohol 120% with certain limitations. These include only being able to burn to one drive at a time, only using up to two virtual drives and no copy protection emulation options.
- Alcohol 120% Retro Edition is a free version only for personal use on Windows 95/98/Me/XP (it cannot be run on Vista or later), allowing retrogamers to mount image files when using PCem or VMWare Workstation (DOSBox Pure cannot run it, because doing so will no doubt cause a crash). Li Wen'en (李文恩) talked about the issue with the developers; however, because many early programming tools were lost, debugging becomes very difficult, causing the problem may be quite time-consuming to fix or even be postponed.

== Awards ==
- European ShareWare Conference 2006 Epsilon Award

== See also ==
- Comparison of ISO image software
- SCSI Pass-Through Direct (SPTD)
