= WinCDEmu =

Utility for mounting disk image files in Microsoft Windows

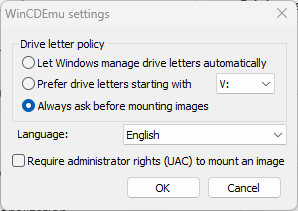
- WinCDEmu 4.1
- Developer: Sysprogs UG
- Release: 29 July 2008; 18 years ago
- Stable release: 4.1 / 29 September 2015; 10 years ago
- Written in: C/C++
- Operating system: Windows XP and later
- Platform: IA-32, x64
- Size: 1.4 MB
- Available in: 38 languages
- List of languages Arabic, Bengali, Bulgarian, Catalan, Chinese Simplified, Chinese Traditional, Danish, Dutch, English, Estonian, Persian, Finnish, French, German, Greek, Hebrew, Hungarian, Italian, Japanese, Korean, Lithuanian, Macedonian, Malaysian, Norwegian, Polish, Portuguese (Brazil), Portuguese, Romanian, Russian, Slovak, Spanish, Serbian, Swedish, Taiwanese, Tamil, Turkish, Ukrainian, Uzbek
- Type: Virtual drive
- License: GNU LGPLv3
- Website: wincdemu-gui.github.io
- Repository: github.com/sysprogs/WinCDEmu

WinCDEmu is an open-source utility for mounting disk image files in Microsoft Windows. It installs a Windows device driver which allows a user to access an image of a CD or DVD as if it were a physical drive. WinCDEmu supports ISO, CUE/BIN, CCD/IMG, NRG, MDS/MDF and RAW formats.

== Language support ==
WinCDEmu supports 38 languages: Arabic, Bengali, Bulgarian, Catalan, Chinese Simplified, Chinese Traditional, Danish, Dutch, English, Estonian, Persian, Finnish, French, German, Greek, Hebrew, Hungarian, Italian, Japanese, Korean, Lithuanian, Macedonian, Malaysian, Norwegian, Polish, Portuguese (Brazil), Portuguese, Romanian, Russian, Slovak, Spanish, Serbian, Swedish, Taiwanese, Tamil, Turkish, Ukrainian, Uzbek

== See also ==
- Daemon Tools
- Alcohol 120%
