= Daemon Tools =

Software for virtual drives

DAEMON Tools

- DAEMON Tools Pro running on Windows 7
- Developer: Disc Soft Ltd.
- Stable release: Ultra 6: 6.2.0 / 16 March 2023; 3 years ago; Lite 12: 12.0.0 / 27 September 2023; 2 years ago; for Mac 8: 8.5.0 / 17 October 2022; 3 years ago; Pro 8: 8.3.1 / 17 August 2021; 5 years ago; Net 6: 6.0.0 / 17 February 2017; 9 years ago; USB 2: 2.0 / 29 November 2012; 13 years ago
- Operating system: Windows 98, Windows 2000 and later; OS X 10.6 or later (DT for Mac 2)
- Available in: 38 Languages with additional translation packs
- Type: Virtual drive
- License: Shareware
- Website: www.daemon-tools.cc

- Supported file types
- File Types: Details
- b5t: BlindWrite
- b6t: BlindWrite
- bwt: BlindRead
- ccd: CloneCD
- cdi: DiscJuggler
- cue/bin: Cue Sheet
- iso: Standard ISO
- isz: Compressed ISO
- mds/mdf: Media Descriptor File
- mdx: Media Data eXtended
- nrg: Nero Burning ROM disc image
- ape/cue: APE images
- flac: Free Lossless Audio Codec images
- As of August 2014

DAEMON Tools is a virtual drive and optical disc authoring program for Microsoft Windows and Mac OS.

== Overview ==
DAEMON tools was originally a successor of Generic SafeDisc emulator and incorporated all of its features. The program claims to be able to defeat most copy protection schemes such as SafeDisc and SecuROM. It is currently compatible with Windows XP, Windows Vista, Windows 7, Windows 8, and Windows 10. DAEMON Tools has a special mode for proper operation of copies of discs with advanced protection (SafeDisc, SecuRom and LaserLock, CD-Cops, StarForce and Protect CD), which are used on some discs with games.

== Editions ==
Six editions of the product exist: Ultra, Lite, Pro Standard, Pro Advanced, Net and DT for Mac. A feature comparison is given below. Also, the company provides two additional solutions for the data storage organization: DAEMON Tools USB 2 that allows sharing different types of USB devices between remote workstations and DAEMON Tools iSCSI Target 2 – a cross-platform solution that enables creating an iSCSI storage server and provides access to virtual or physical devices, along with VHD images, within home or corporate network.

Feature	Lite 5	Pro Standard 5	Pro Advanced 5	Net 5	Ultra 2	for Mac 2
License type	Adware^{A} / Shareware^{B}	Shareware	Shareware	Shareware	Shareware	Shareware
Maximum number of DT and SCSI virtual devices	4	16	32	32	32	Unlimited
Maximum number of IDE virtual devices	0	0	4	4	4	0
Command-line interface	Yes	Yes	Yes	Yes	Yes	No
Image compression	Yes	Yes	Yes	Yes	Yes	No
Image password protection^{C}	Yes	Yes	Yes	Yes	Yes	No
Image creation^{D}	Extraction only; no preset profiles	Yes	Yes	Yes	Yes	No
Burning images	Needs Astroburn	Yes	Yes	Yes	Yes	No
Image collection's management	No	Yes	Yes	Yes	Yes	Yes
Image editing	No	Yes	Yes	Yes	Yes	No
Image splitting^{E}	No	Yes	Yes	Yes	Yes	No
Shell extensions	No	Yes	Yes	Yes	No	Yes
Virtual device property monitoring	No	Yes	Yes	Yes	Yes	No
Volume Mount Points^{F}	No	Yes	Yes	Yes	Yes	No
Burning RMPS data on discs	No	No	Yes	Yes	Yes	No
Image conversion^{D}	No	No	Yes	Yes	Yes	No
Mounting virtual hard disks (VHD)	No	No	No	No	Yes	Yes
Installation over the network	No	No	No	Yes	No	No
Image Catalog sharing	No	No	No	Yes	No	No
iSCSI Server	No	No	No	Up to 16 targets	No	No
iSCSI Initiator	No	No	No	Yes	Yes	Yes
Mounting images on remote computers	No	No	No	Yes	Yes	No
Sharing disc drives on the network	No	No	No	Yes	No	No
Bootable USB creation	No	No	No	No	Yes	No
RAM Disk creation	No	No	No	No	Yes	No
TrueCrypt image creation	No	No	No	No	Yes	No
Mounting ZIP files	No	No	No	No	Yes	No

Notes
A. Free for non-commercial use without technical support. Technical support and the right to use commercially may be purchased.
B. In Korea, Freemium license is not available since ver. 4.45.1.
C. Applies on to .mds and .mdx images.
D. Supported output formats include .iso, .mds/.mdf and .mdx
E. The ability to split an image files into multiple files of fxed maximum sizes. Not supported by DAEMON Tools Lite, as of 22 February 2012.
F. The ability to mount an image into a folder on an NTFS drive

== File format ==
The default file format of DAEMON Tools is Media Data eXtended (MDX). MDX is a disc image file format similar to MDS/MDF images. It supports all of MDS/MDF format features except that all data is in one monolithic file only. The files of these types bear the filename extension of .mdx.

MDX file contains metadata of original media – specifically the main physical parameters of disc, such as layer breaks, sessions, tracks and other. It could be described as being an archive file containing all data from a CD/DVD. It also supports data compression. MDX file includes the magic number "MEDIA DESCRIPTOR" at the beginning of the file.

== Controversy ==
On 13 February 2012, one of DAEMON Tools' components known as MountSpace became a subject of privacy concerns. MountSpace, a service-oriented component gathers and sends information about disc images used in DAEMON Tools to mountspace.com along with users' IP addresses. Although MountSpace can be disabled during installation, it is criticized for transmitting information despite being disabled and lacking a privacy policy. The initial discovery of the concerning issue is attributed to Rafael Rivera of Within Windows blog.

In May 2026, DAEMON Tools were compromised to a targeted "supply chain" attack by suspected Chinese hackers. They used a malicious backdoor to plant malware across the retail, scientific and manufacturing sectors across multiple countries including Russia, Belarus, and Thailand.

== Related programs ==
=== Y.A.S.U. ===
Y.A.S.U.
- Developer: sYk0
- Stable release: 1.6.9040 / 4 February 2009; 17 years ago
- Operating system: Microsoft Windows
- Available in: English
- License: Freeware
- Website: forum.daemon-tools.cc/f40/

Y.A.S.U. (Yet Another SecuROM Utility) is a tiny tool that works as an SCSI-drive protector. It was created by sYk0 (pronounced psycho) and can be used to hide emulated drives from SecuROM 7 and SafeDisc 4. Y.A.S.U. is a companion program for Daemon Tools, being currently hosted, supported and maintained by the Daemon Tools team. On March 4, 2009, sYk0 announced development of Omen, which was meant to be a successor to Y.A.S.U., but had its development abandoned in January of 2010.

== See also ==
- Comparison of disc image software
- WinCDEmu
- Alcohol 120%
- SCSI Pass-Through Direct (SPTD)
