= Media Descriptor File =

Disc image file format

- Filename extension: .mdf
- Type of format: Disc image

Media Descriptor
- Filename extension: .mds
- Magic number: MEDIA DESCRIPTOR
- Type of format: Sidecar file

Media Descriptor File (MDF) is a proprietary disc image file format developed for Alcohol 120%, an optical disc authoring program. Daemon Tools, CDemu, MagicISO, PowerDVD, and WinCDEmu can also read the MDF format. A disc image is a computer file replica of the computer files and file system of an optical disc.

Unlike an ISO image, a Media Descriptor File can contain multiple layers (as used in dual-layer recording) and multiple optical disc tracks. Like the IMG file format, a Media Descriptor File is a "raw" image of an optical disc. The word raw implies that the copy is precise, bit-for-bit, including (where appropriate) file-system metadata.

A Media Descriptor File may be accompanied by a Media Descriptor Sidecar file. This optional binary file (with file extension .mds) contains metadata about an imaged optical disc, including a delineation of where disc layers begin and end ("layer breaks"), and which portions of the MDF belong in which disc layer. The MDS file also stores the location and value of the layer breach bit, a CD/DVD copy protection mechanism. The MDS file is comparable to the CloneCD Control File and cue sheet (.cue) file formats. However, their capabilities are not identical; also the cue sheet is a text file format.

Alcohol 120%'s MDF/MDS format is one of the few formats besides Nero's NRG, BIN/CUE and CloneCD's CCD/IMG/SUB disc image formats to support Mixed Mode CDs which contain audio CD tracks as well as data tracks.

== See also ==
- Comparison of disc image software
