= No-disc crack =

Disc copy protection circumvention

A No-disc crack, No-CD crack or No-DVD crack is an executable file or a special "byte patcher" program which allows a user to circumvent certain Compact Disc and DVD copy protection schemes. They allow the user to run computer software without having to insert their required CD-ROM or DVD-ROM. This act is a form of software cracking. No-CD cracks specific to a variety of games and other software distributed on CD-ROM or DVD-ROM can be found on the Internet from various reverse engineering websites or file sharing networks. No-CD cracks have legal uses, such as creating backups of legally owned software (a user right by law in many countries) or avoiding the inconvenience of placing a CD or DVD-ROM in the drive every time the software is being used, although they can also be used to circumvent laws in many countries by allowing the execution of full versions of non-legally owned applications or time-limited trials of the applications without the original disc.

In addition to cracked executable files or byte patchers, CD protection can sometimes be thwarted by producing a mini image containing only enough of the software's CD-ROM contents needed to bypass protection. This image can then be mounted with a disk image emulator such as Daemon Tools to "trick" the user's computer's operating system (OS) into believing that the disk image is a physical optical disk inserted into a physical optical drive attached to the computer. As a side benefit, data from mounted disk images generally load much faster than a real disk would because the data is stored on the hard drive. Some programs, however, attempt to discover such disk image emulators and will refuse to work if one is found. Other programs exist that attempt to hide the presence of disk image emulators from such protected software. However, if some of the software was running in a virtualization suite such as Windows Virtual PC or VirtualBox, the guest OS will further be confused into thinking it is the "physical" disc.

Some publishers have used no-disc cracks to re-release older games for modern PCs, including Ubisoft (with Tom Clancy's Rainbow Six: Vegas 2) and Rockstar Games (with Max Payne 2: The Fall of Max Payne).

== Law limitations ==
See the below excerpt from United States Copyright Law in regards to computer software.

§ 117. Limitations on exclusive rights: Computer programs

(a) Making of Additional Copy or Adaptation by Owner of Copy. — Not withstanding the provisions of section 106, it is not an infringement for the owner of a copy of a computer program to make or authorize the making of another copy or adaptation of that computer program provided:

(1) that such a new copy or adaptation is created as an essential step in the utilization of the computer program in conjunction with a machine and that it is used in no other manner, or

(2) that such new copy or adaptation is for archival purposes only and that all archival copies are destroyed in the event that continued possession of the computer program should cease to be rightful.

== See also ==
- ISO image
