= Software cracking =

Modification of software, often to use it for free

Software cracking (known as "breaking" mostly in the 1980s) is an act of removing copy protection from software. Copy protection can be removed by applying a specific crack. A crack can mean any tool that enables breaking software protection, a stolen product key, or guessed password. Cracking software generally involves circumventing licensing and usage restrictions on commercial software by illegal methods. These methods can include modifying code directly through disassembling and bit editing, sharing stolen product keys, or developing software to generate activation keys. Examples of cracks are: applying a patch or by creating reverse-engineered serial number generators known as keygens, thus bypassing software registration and payments or converting a trial/demo version of the software into fully-functioning software without paying for it. Software cracking contributes to the rise of online piracy where pirated software is distributed to end-users through filesharing sites like BitTorrent, One click hosting (OCH), or via Usenet downloads, or by downloading bundles of the original software with cracks or keygens.

Some of these tools are called keygen, patch, loader, or no-disc crack. A keygen is a handmade product serial number generator that often offers the ability to generate working serial numbers in your own name. A patch is a small computer program that modifies the machine code of another program. This has the advantage for a cracker to not include a large executable in a release when only a few bytes are changed. A loader modifies the startup flow of a program and does not remove the protection but circumvents it. A well-known example of a loader is a trainer used to cheat in games. Fairlight pointed out in one of their .nfo files that these types of cracks are not allowed for warez scene game releases. A nukewar has shown that the protection may not kick in at any point for it to be a valid crack.

Software cracking is closely related to reverse engineering because the process of attacking a copy protection technology, is similar to the process of reverse engineering. The distribution of cracked copies is illegal in most countries. There have been lawsuits over cracking software. It might be legal to use cracked software in certain circumstances. Educational resources for reverse engineering and software cracking are, however, legal and available in the form of Crackme programs.

== History ==
Software is inherently expensive to produce but cheap to duplicate and distribute. Therefore, software producers generally tried to implement some form of copy protection before releasing it to the market. In 1984, Laind Huntsman, the head of software development for Formaster, a software protection company, commented that "no protection system has remained uncracked by enterprising programmers for more than a few months". In 2001, Dan S. Wallach, a professor from Rice University, argued that "those determined to bypass copy-protection have always found ways to do so – and always will".

Most of the early software crackers were computer hobbyists who often formed groups that competed against each other in the cracking and spreading of software. Breaking a new copy protection scheme as quickly as possible was often regarded as an opportunity to demonstrate one's technical superiority rather than a possibility of money-making. Software crackers usually did not benefit materially from their actions and their motivation was the challenge itself of removing the protection. Some low skilled hobbyists would take already cracked software and edit various unencrypted strings of text in it to change messages a game would tell a game player, often something considered vulgar. Uploading the altered copies on file sharing networks provided a source of laughs for adult users. The cracker groups of the 1980s started to advertise themselves and their skills by attaching animated screens known as crack intros in the software programs they cracked and released. Once the technical competition had expanded from the challenges of cracking to the challenges of creating visually stunning intros, the foundations for a new subculture known as demoscene were established. Demoscene started to separate itself from the illegal "warez scene" during the 1990s and is now regarded as a completely different subculture. Many software crackers have later grown into extremely capable software reverse engineers; the deep knowledge of assembly required in order to crack protections enables them to reverse engineer drivers in order to port them from binary-only drivers for Windows to drivers with source code for Linux and other free operating systems. Also because music and game intro was such an integral part of gaming the music format and graphics became very popular when hardware became affordable for the home user.

With the rise of the Internet, software crackers developed secretive online organizations. In the latter half of the nineties, one of the most respected sources of information about "software protection reversing" was Fravia's website.

In 2017, a group of software crackers started a project to preserve Apple II software by removing the copy protection.

== +HCU ==
The High Cracking University (+HCU) was founded by Old Red Cracker (+ORC), considered a genius of reverse engineering and a legendary figure in Reverse Code Engineering (RCE), to advance research into RCE. He had also taught and authored many papers on the subject, and his texts are considered classics in the field and are mandatory reading for students of RCE.

The addition of the "+" sign in front of the nickname of a reverser signified membership in the +HCU. Amongst the students of +HCU were the top of the elite Windows reversers worldwide. +HCU published a new reverse engineering problem annually and a small number of respondents with the best replies qualified for an undergraduate position at the university.

+Fravia was a professor at +HCU. Fravia's website was known as "+Fravia's Pages of Reverse Engineering" and he used it to challenge programmers as well as the wider society to "reverse engineer" the "brainwashing of a corrupt and rampant materialism". In its heyday, his website received millions of visitors per year and its influence was "widespread". On his site, +Fravia also maintained a database of the tutorials generated by +HCU students for posterity.

Nowadays most of the graduates of +HCU have migrated to Linux and few have remained as Windows reversers. The information at the university has been rediscovered by a new generation of researchers and practitioners of RCE who have started new research projects in the field.

== Methods ==
The most common software crack is the modification of an application's binary to cause or prevent a specific key branch in the program's execution. This is accomplished by reverse engineering the compiled program code using a debugger such as x64dbg, SoftICE, OllyDbg, GDB, or MacsBug until the software cracker reaches the subroutine that contains the primary method of protecting the software (or by disassembling an executable file with a program such as IDA). The binary is then modified using the debugger or a hex editor such as HIEW or monitor in a manner that replaces a prior branching opcode with its complement or a NOP opcode so the key branch will either always execute a specific subroutine or skip over it. Almost all common software cracks are a variation of this type. A region of code that must not be entered is often called a "bad boy" while one that should be followed is a "good boy".

Proprietary software developers are constantly developing techniques such as code obfuscation, encryption, and self-modifying code to make binary modification increasingly difficult. Even with these measures being taken, developers struggle to combat software cracking. This is because it is very common for a professional to publicly release a simple cracked EXE or Retrium Installer for public download, eliminating the need for inexperienced users to crack the software themselves.

A specific example of this technique is a crack that removes the expiration period from a time-limited trial of an application. These cracks are usually programs that alter the program executable and sometimes shared libraries linked to the application and the process of altering the original binary files is called patching. Similar cracks are available for software that requires a hardware dongle. A company can also break the copy protection of programs that they have legally purchased but that are licensed to particular hardware, so that there is no risk of downtime due to hardware failure (and, of course, no need to restrict oneself to running the software on bought hardware only).

Another method is the use of special software such as CloneCD to scan for the use of a commercial copy protection application. After discovering the software used to protect the application, another tool may be used to remove the copy protection from the software on the CD or DVD. This may enable another program such as Alcohol 120%, CloneDVD, Game Jackal, or Daemon Tools to copy the protected software to a user's hard disk. Popular commercial copy protection applications which may be scanned for include SafeDisc and StarForce.

In other cases, it might be possible to decompile a program in order to get access to the original source code or code on a level higher than machine code. This is often possible with scripting languages and languages utilizing JIT compilation. An example is cracking (or debugging) on the .NET platform where one might consider manipulating CIL to achieve one's needs. Java's bytecode also works in a similar fashion in which there is an intermediate language before the program is compiled to run on the platform dependent machine code.

Advanced reverse engineering for protections such as SecuROM, SafeDisc, StarForce, or Denuvo requires a cracker, or many crackers to spend much more time studying the protection, eventually finding every flaw within the protection code, and then coding their own tools to "unwrap" the protection automatically from executable (.EXE) and library (.DLL) files.

There are a number of sites on the Internet that let users download cracks produced by warez groups for popular games and applications (although at the danger of acquiring malicious software that is sometimes distributed via such sites). Although these cracks are used by legal buyers of software, they can also be used by people who have downloaded or otherwise obtained unauthorized copies (often through P2P networks).

== Software piracy ==
Software cracking has led to the distribution of pirated software around the world (software piracy). It was estimated that the United States lost US$2.3 billion in business application software in 1996. Software piracy rates were especially prevalent in African, Asian, Eastern European, and Latin American countries. In certain countries such as Indonesia, Pakistan, Bangladesh, Kuwait, China, and El Salvador, 90% of the software used was pirated.

== See also ==
- Reverse engineering
- System reconfiguration attacks
- Crack intro
- Demoscene
- WannaCry
