= SafeDisc =

Copy-protection software

- Developers: Macrovision Corporation (1999–2007); Trymedia (2008–2009)
- Initial release: 1998; 27 years ago
- Final release: 4.90.010 / 2 May 2008; 17 years ago
- Operating system: Microsoft Windows
- Platform: x86
- Available in: English
- Type: Copy protection

SafeDisc is a copy protection program for Microsoft Windows applications and games distributed on optical disc. Created by Macrovision Corporation, it was aimed to hinder disc duplication. The program was first introduced in 1998 and was discontinued on March 31, 2009.

Although the stated use is to prevent piracy, many, including the Electronic Frontier Foundation, believe it is used to restrict one's fair-use rights.

== History ==
There have been several editions of SafeDisc over the years. Each one had the goal of making discs harder to copy. The last revision was marketed as SafeDisc Advanced.

The early versions of SafeDisc did not make the discs very difficult to copy. Later versions 2.9+ could produce discs that are difficult to copy or reverse engineer, requiring specific burners capable of emulating the "weak sectors" and odd data formats that are characteristic of SafeDisc.

=== Withdrawal of support ===
Shortly after the release of Windows 10 in 2015, Microsoft announced that games with SafeDisc DRM would not run on the operating system, citing security concerns over the software due to the way in which it becomes "deeply embedded" in the system. Microsoft stated that supporting SafeDisc could have been a possible loophole for computer viruses to exploit. Support for SafeDisc on earlier versions of Windows was withdrawn upon the release of update number 3086255 in 2015.

== Circumvention ==
Previous versions of SafeDisc were overcome by disc image emulator software such as Daemon Tools and Alcohol 120%. SafeDisc currently blacklists such software, meaning that those who want to use this method must install additional software to cloak the mounter; examples include CureRom and Y.A.S.U.

Another potential attack on SafeDisc is to pull the encrypted application out of the archive it is contained in. All SafeDisc encrypted discs contain an ICD file, an encrypted format used by SafeDisc to ensure that the original CD is loaded. UnSafeDisc circumvents and decrypts SafeDisc encrypted files by opening the ICD file format, decrypting it, and converting it to an EXE file. However, each program requires a specific patch to enable full functionality.

== Operation ==
SafeDisc adds a unique digital signature to the optical media at the time of replication. Each time a SafeDisc-protected program runs, the SafeDisc authenticator performs various security checks and verifies the SafeDisc signature on the optical media. The authentication process takes about 10 to 20 seconds. Once verification has been established, the sequence is complete and the program will start normally. The SafeDisc signature is designed to be difficult to copy or transfer from the original media. (For example, it might change as a result of error correction during the copying process.) Certain multimedia programs are designed to run from the PC's hard drive without accessing files from the program disc after the initial installation. SafeDisc will permit this as long as the consumer retains the original CD or DVD, which is required for authentication each time the program is launched. Failure to place the original disc in the drive when loading the program will prevent validation of the SafeDisc signature.

== Version history ==
=== SafeDisc (V1) (1998–2001) ===
SafeDisc V1 protected CDs can be recognized by several files on the CD:

- 00000001.TMP
- CLCD16.DLL
- CLCD32.DLL
- CLOKSPL.EXE
- DPLAYERX.DLL

And also by the existence of two files game.EXE and game.ICD (where game is replaced with the actual game's name).

The EXE executable is only a loader which decrypts and loads the protected game executable in the encrypted ICD file.

The initial version of SafeDisc was easy for home users and professional duplicators alike to copy, due to the fact that the ICD file can be decrypted and converted into an EXE file.

=== SafeDisc (V2) (November 2000–2003) ===
The following files should exist on every original CD:

- 00000001.TMP
- 00000002.TMP (not always present)

The loader file (game.EXE) is now integrated into the main executable, making the game.ICD file obsolete. Also the CLOKSPL.EXE file, which was present in SafeDisc v1, no longer exists.

The SD2 version can be found inside the game.EXE file through its string: BoG_ *90.0&!! Yy>, followed by three unsigned longs, these are the version, subversion and revision numbers (in hex). When making a backup, read errors will be encountered between sectors 800–10663.

The protection also has "weak" sectors, introduced with this version, which causes synchronization problems with certain CD-Writers. Digital signatures are still present in this version. But this has no effect on disc images mounted in Daemon Tools or similar programs. In addition, SafeDisc Version 2.50 added ATIP detection making it impossible to use a copy in a burner unless software that masks this is used (CloneCD has the ability to do this.) SafeDisc Versions 2.90 and above make burning copies more difficult requiring burners that are capable of burning the "weak sectors"; these drives are uncommon. However, there are software solutions that eliminate the need for specialized hardware.

=== SafeDisc (V3) (2003–2005) ===
SafeDisc v3 uses a key to encrypt the main executable (EXE or DLL) and creates a corresponding digital signature which is added to the CD-ROM/DVD-ROM when they are replicated. The size of the digital signature varies from 3 to 20 MB depending how good the encryption must be. The authentication process takes about 10 to 20 seconds.

SafeDisc v3 is capable of encrypting multiple executables over one or more CDs/DVDs, as long as the executables are encrypted with the same key and the digital signature is added to each media. SafeDisc v3 supports Virtual Drives as long as the original CD/DVD is available. Once the CD has been authenticated the game should continue to run from the virtual drive, provided the virtual drive software has not been blacklisted.

CloneCD is able to make copies of V3.

=== SafeDisc (V4) (2005–2008) ===
The final major SafeDisc version was Version 4, released in February 2005. It lost ground to SecuROM over time, with the final build being version 4.90.010 in May 2008, and with the product being discontinued on March 30, 2009.

== SafeDisc driver vulnerabilities ==
On November 7, 2007, Microsoft stated that "there is vulnerability in Macrovision SECDRV.SYS driver on Windows and it could allow elevation of privilege. This vulnerability was patched by Microsoft on December 11, 2007 This vulnerability does not affect Windows Vista. The driver, secdrv.sys, is used by games which use Macrovision SafeDisc. Without the driver, games with SafeDisc protection would be unable to play on Windows. Ultimately, this would prove to be one of the factors that would lead to them to drop support for the program in 2015.
