= Cue sheet (computing) =

Computer file format

A cue sheet, or cue file, is a metadata file which describes how the tracks of a CD or DVD are laid out. Cue sheets are stored as plain text files and commonly have a .cue filename extension. CDRWIN first introduced cue sheets, which are now supported by many optical disc authoring applications and media players.

== Overview ==
Cue sheets can describe many types of audio and data CDs. The main data (including audio) for a CD described by a cue sheet is stored in one or more files referenced by the cue sheet. Cue sheets also specify track lengths and CD-Text including track and disc titles and performers. They are especially useful when dividing audio stored in a single file into multiple songs or tracks. The data files referred to by the cue sheet may be audio files (commonly in MP3 or WAV format), or plain disc images, usually with a .bin extension.

When used for disc images, the format is usually called BIN/CUE, indicating that it stores a disc image composed of one cue sheet file and one or more .bin files. The .bin files are raw sector-by-sector binary copies of tracks in the original discs. These binary .bin files usually contain all 2,352 bytes from each sector in an optical disc, including control headers and error correction data in the case of CD-ROMs (unlike ISO images of CD-ROMs, which store only the user data). However, the TRACK command in a cue sheet file can be used to refer to binary disc images that contain only the user data of each sector, by indicating the specific CD mode of the tracks from which the image was created (which is necessary to know the size of the user data in each sector).

The BIN/CUE format is one of the few formats besides Nero's NRG, Alcohol 120%'s MDF/MDS and CloneCD's CCD/IMG/SUB disc image formats to support Mixed Mode CDs which can contain audio CD tracks as well as data tracks.

The name "cue sheet" originates from the "send cue sheet" SCSI/ATA command in optical disc authoring. The specification for that command defines a cue sheet format containing mostly the same information, but in a tabular, binary data structure, rather than a text file.

In October 2023, a vulnerability was discovered in the libcue library, which parses cue sheets on Linux systems with GNOME desktops. The exploit could give an attacker code execution rights on GNOME systems.

== Audio file playback ==
An entire multi-track audio CD may be ripped to a single audio file and a cue sheet. However, software audio players and hardware digital audio players often treat each audio file as a single playlist entry, which can make it difficult to select and identify the individual tracks. A common solution is to split the original audio file into a series of separate files, one per track.

Another approach is for the audio player to support the cue sheet directly. This may involve providing a new playlist (for example, an extra window) for the contents of the cue sheet, or adding an entry for each track directly into the main playlist.

== Cue sheet syntax ==
A cue sheet is a plain text file containing commands with one or more parameters. The commands usually apply either to the whole disc or to an individual track, depending on the particular command and the context. They may describe the layout of data to be written, or CD-Text (metadata). The original specification of the cue sheet syntax and semantics appears in the CDRWIN User Guide.

The standard commands are:

=== Essential commands ===
FILE

Names a file containing the data and its format (such as MP3, and WAVE audio file formats, and plain "binary" disc images)

TRACK

Defines a track context, providing its number and type or mode (for instance AUDIO or various CD-ROM modes). Some commands that follow this command apply to the track rather than the entire disc.

INDEX

Indicates an index (position) within the current FILE. The position is specified in mm:ss:ff (minute-second-frame) format. There are 75 such frames per second of audio. In the context of cue sheets, "frames" refer to CD sectors, despite a different, lower-level structure in CDs also being known as frames. INDEX 01 is required and denotes the start of the track, while INDEX 00 is optional and denotes the pregap. The pregap of Track 1 is used for Hidden Track One Audio (HTOA). Optional higher-numbered indexes (02 through 99) are also allowed.

PREGAP and POSTGAP

Indicates the length of a track's pregap or postgap, which is not stored in any data file. The length is specified in the same minute-second-frame format as for INDEX.

=== CD-Text and other metadata commands ===
REM

Adds a comment that usually has no bearing on the written CD at all, with the exception of some applications that use it to store additional metadata (e.g. Exact Audio Copy writes some additional fields, which foobar2000 can read). REM should not appear on a line by itself as some applications regard it as a syntax error.

CDTEXTFILE

Identifies a file containing CD-Text information

FLAGS

Sets subcode flags of a track

CATALOG

Contains the UPC/EAN code of the disc

ISRC

Define the ISRC of the current TRACK

TITLE, PERFORMER and SONGWRITER

CD-Text metadata; applies to the whole disc or a specific track, depending on the context

== Non-standard cue sheets ==
=== Multiple FILEs with gaps ===
CD ripping programs normally offer the option of creating a separate file for each audio track, with the (pre)gap portion of a track placed at the end of the preceding track's file. This coincides with normal playback operation – the beginning of each file is the beginning of a track, not the gap preceding it – and with the layout described in the disc's table of contents, which doesn't specify gap information at all.

The cue sheet format, as specified in the CDRWIN Users Manual, doesn't support file sets of this type; rather, it's designed with the expectation that all of the audio data exists in a single file (CDRWIN only creates cue sheets for that kind of rip) or in separate files, but only with the gap portions of the audio either removed or placed at the beginning of the files.

In order to allow cue sheets to be used to burn a CD from ordinary file sets which have the gap portion at the end of each file, the CD ripping & burning program Exact Audio Copy (EAC) allows the creation of cue sheets that relax the CDRWIN Users Manual's restriction on where FILE commands can be used. This non-conforming cue sheet format, intended only for burning CDs with EAC, is not supported by some other pieces of software, such as the media player foobar2000, which allows the use of cue sheets as playlists.

=== Non-wav files before WAVE ===
A number of programs, including VLC and Foobar2000, allow the use of WavPack and FLAC files before a WAVE filetype. This sort of file is also created by EAC.

== Examples ==
The MP3 file "Faithless - Live in Berlin.mp3", contains a live recording of the band Faithless. At this concert, Faithless performed eight songs in the order shown below. Therefore, the track listing is as follows:

1. Faithless – Reverence
2. Faithless – She's My Baby
3. Faithless – Take the Long Way Home
4. Faithless – Insomnia
5. Faithless – Bring the Family Back
6. Faithless – Salva Mea
7. Faithless – Dirty Old Man
8. Faithless – God Is a DJ

Since the MP3 is one file containing the entire performance, burning it to a CD as-is would make it inconvenient to skip to individual songs. To design the cue sheet, one must first find the points in the MP3 at which each song starts. The times are cumulative: each track must have a later time than the previous one.

The first five lines denote the disc information. This is followed by the information for each track, indented from the rest. The INDEX 01 line reads the same for each track, with the exception of the time value that follows it. REM, TITLE and PERFORMER are optional.

REM GENRE Electronica
REM DATE 1998
PERFORMER "Faithless"
TITLE "Live in Berlin"
FILE "Faithless - Live in Berlin.mp3" MP3
  TRACK 01 AUDIO
    TITLE "Reverence"
    PERFORMER "Faithless"
    INDEX 01 00:00:00
  TRACK 02 AUDIO
    TITLE "She's My Baby"
    PERFORMER "Faithless"
    INDEX 01 06:42:00
  TRACK 03 AUDIO
    TITLE "Take the Long Way Home"
    PERFORMER "Faithless"
    INDEX 01 10:54:00
  TRACK 04 AUDIO
    TITLE "Insomnia"
    PERFORMER "Faithless"
    INDEX 01 17:04:00
  TRACK 05 AUDIO
    TITLE "Bring the Family Back"
    PERFORMER "Faithless"
    INDEX 01 25:44:00
  TRACK 06 AUDIO
    TITLE "Salva Mea"
    PERFORMER "Faithless"
    INDEX 01 30:50:00
  TRACK 07 AUDIO
    TITLE "Dirty Old Man"
    PERFORMER "Faithless"
    INDEX 01 38:24:00
  TRACK 08 AUDIO
    TITLE "God Is a DJ"
    PERFORMER "Faithless"
    INDEX 01 42:35:00

An example of a cue sheet used in conjunction with a CD image file:

FILE "sampleimage.bin" BINARY
  TRACK 01 MODE1/2352
    INDEX 01 00:00:00

To convert a CD-ROM image to a format that can be mounted on Unix-like systems, the open source tool BinChunker can be used:

$ bchunk image.bin image.cue output.iso

== See also ==
- Comparison of audio player software#Metadata ability
- Comparison of video player software#Metadata ability
- Comparison of disc authoring software
- Exact Audio Copy (EAC) – a proprietary CD ripping program
- MusicBrainz Picard – a cross-platform MusicBrainz tag editor written in Python
