= Audio track =

Audio track may refer to:

- An audio signal communication channel in a storage device or mixing console
- Track (optical disc), a subdivision of an optical disc, such as a compact disc
  - Music track, an individual song or instrumental recording on an album
