= CDRWIN =

CD Burning software by Microsoft

- CDRWIN 4.0G
- Developer(s): Golden Hawk Technology
- Final release: 4.0H / May 28, 2010; 15 years ago
- Operating system: Windows 95 and later
- License: Shareware

CDRWIN was a CD/DVD burning software for Microsoft Windows developed by Golden Hawk Technology.

It progressed from lone wolf Jeff Arnold's hobby to a full-blown recording software that equals the power, performance, and features of many of the programs from the big boys.

— Robert Starrett, EMedia : digital studio magazine

Once popular, CDRWIN's usage diminished due to the bundling of limited versions of other software packages, such as Nero Burning ROM and Roxio Easy CD Creator, with new computers and optical drives.

The company behind original CDRWIN, Golden Hawk Technology, no longer exists.

== Features ==
CDRWin opened to a window with large buttons. Buttons included "Record Disc", "Copy Disc", "Tools", "Contents", "Settings", "Unlock", and "Exit". Each button showed the user a window that allowed them to do the appropriate task.

The "Record Disc" window allowed the user to choose the target recorder, recording options (such as test mode, speed, and beep at completion), and set up an attached Kodak Disc Transporter.

The "Copy Disc" window let the user select whether they wanted to copy a disc, a track, or just specific sectors. It could also copy audio or data discs.

For mixed and raw data there was the possibility to adjust the Mode 1 and Mode 2 transfer to Mode 1 Form 1. The ability to enable and disable jitter correction and set subcode options was also available. While copying, a graphical representation of the disc would appear.

The "Tools" button allowed the user to set source and destination devices and the type of operation to be performed, including image file generation, copying discs to images, and copying a SCSI device to the CD recorder.

The "Contents" button showed disc information, including the number and type of tracks, the number of sessions, and the total disc time.

The "Settings" window allowed the user to set up and choose the reader and recorder, any SCSI hard drive to be used, and the Kodak Disc Transporter, if attached.

== Unique features ==
CDRWIN was known for its unique features such as analyzing the TOC of a CD. It is also one of the programs which introduced the cue sheet format.

== PlayStation TOC Protection ==
CDRWIN was mostly used during the PlayStation era. People could back up PlayStation games quickly and easily, and soon discovered that its unique cue sheet operations allowed them to alter the TOC for any CD being duplicated provided that the CD writer supported writing invalid TOCs. Most CD burning software could not make copies or images of the CD if the TOC was invalid.

This problem was overcome when CDRWIN was released, and duplication was made more accessible when Nero Burning ROM was updated to support this type of copying.

== See also ==
- List of optical disc authoring software
