= Loopback device =

Loopback device may refer to:

- Loopback, related to electronic communication interfaces
- Loop device, a pseudo-device in Unix-like operating systems
