= Frankfurt Group (disambiguation) =

The Frankfurt Group was a group of 19th Century musicians.

The Frankfurt Group may also refer to:

- The "Frankfurt group", a group of al-Qaeda-affiliated terrorists responsible for the Strasbourg Cathedral bombing plot in December 2000
- The Frankfurt Group, proposers of ISO 13490 CD-ROM file system
- The Frankfurt group, involved in the Troubles at Frankfurt in the mid-1550s,
