= System reconfiguration attacks =

System reconfiguration attacks modify settings on a user's PC for malicious purposes. For example: URLs in a favorites file might be modified to direct users to look-alike websites: e.g., a bank website URL may be changed from "bankofabc.com" to "bancofabc.com".
