= ISO 13490 =

Optical disc file system standard

ISO/IEC 13490 (also known as ECMA-168) is the successor to ISO 9660 (level 3), intended to describe the file system of a CD-ROM or CD-R.

ISO 13490 has several improvements over its predecessor. It fully addresses the filename, POSIX attribute, and multibyte character issues that were not handled by ISO 9660. It is also a more efficient format, permits incremental recording, and permits both the ISO 9660 format and ISO/IEC 13490 format to co-exist on the same media. It also specifies how to use multisession properly.

It is derived from the Frankfurt Group (formed in 1990 by many CD-ROM and CD-WO hardware and media manufacturers, CD-ROM data publishers, users of CD-ROMs, and major computer companies) proposal and fully supports orange book media.

== Multiple session overview ==
ISO 13490 define a rule for operating systems as to how to read a multiple-session ISO 9660 volume from a CD-R. Instead of looking for the volume descriptor at offset 32,768 (sector number 16 on a CD) from the start of the disc (which would be the default behavior in ISO 9660), programs accessing the disc should start reading from the 16th sector in the first track of the latest session. Sector numbers form a contiguous sequence starting at the first session, and continue over added sessions and their gaps.

Hence, if a CD mastering program wants to add a single file to a CD-R that has an ISO 9660 volume, it has to append a session containing at least an updated copy of the entire directory tree, plus the new file. The duplicated directory entries can still reference the data files in the previous session(s).

In a similar way, file data can be updated or even removed. Removal is, however, only virtual: the removed content does not appear any more in the directory shown to the user, but it is still physically present on the disc. It can therefore be recovered, and it takes up space (such that the CD will become full even though appearing to still have unused space).

=== Support ===
Though it was originally intended for multisession support only to apply to Mode 2 Form 1 formatted discs, some CD writing software supported multisession writing to Mode 1 format discs. Since only some of the early disc drives supported multisession Mode 1 discs, in many cases the second and following sessions would become unreachable in some drives.

Some older CD writing software, such as Nero Burning ROM, would not import previous session data from an inserted disc. It could thus only write a subsequent session to a disc on the same computer that had written all the previous sessions, and then only if the previous session data was saved before the writing software was closed down.

== See also ==
- Universal Disk Format (UDF) based on ISO/IEC 13346 (also known as ECMA-167)
- Write Once Read Many (WORM)
- ISO/IEC JTC 1
