= LaserLock =

Copy restriction system for CD-ROMs

LaserLock is a copy restriction system for CD-ROMs with 32-bit Windows applications introduced by MLS LaserLock International Inc. in 1995. LaserLock is supposed to check whether the original storage medium of a program is inserted. This check can be done regularly or only once during the installation of the program. If the disk is not accessible, an error window is displayed.

It uses a combination of encryption software and an optical mark on the surface of the disk. The protection code is embedded into an executable file on the disk using a proprietary tool. This file, which is responsible for searching for the physical mark on the disk, is encrypted and gets multiple layers of protection against code analysis to impede reverse engineering. The size of the encrypted file varies from 20 MB on CD-ROMs to 40 MB on DVD-ROMs or occasionally only 5 MB. LaserLock includes a hidden directory on the disk which contains corrupted data. When the disk is copied, the read device encounters errors due to the hidden directory. Copying leads to unstable behavior of the copied software and often to bad sectors that make it impossible to use without the original disk.

== See also ==
- Official FAQ
