= CloneCD Control File =

File format

- Filename extension: .ccd
- Magic number: [CloneCD]
- Extended from: INI file

A CloneCD Control File is a text descriptor with the extension .ccd used by CloneCD to store the subcode data of a CD/DVD image. These files need to be combined with an image file (usually with .img extension) to be burned. It may also come with a subchannel file (usually .sub).

The .ccd extension can be used directly by first-party disc emulator Virtual CloneDrive. It can also be mounted with third-party virtual drives such as Daemon Tools and Alcohol 120%.

The command line Linux application ccd2iso is available to convert ISO9660-compliant CCD/IMG files to an ISO image. The GNU Project's ccd2cue can convert a CCD file to a cue sheet.

The CUE/BIN and MDS/MDF formats have a similar structure to the CCD/IMG format, containing both a raw disc image along with a descriptor file.

The CloneCD CCD/IMG/SUB format is one of the few formats besides Nero's NRG, BIN/CUE and Alcohol 120%'s MDF/MDS disc image formats to support Mixed Mode CDs which contain audio CD tracks, as well as data tracks.

== See also ==
- CloneCD
