= Mtools =

- Developer(s): The GNU Project
- Stable release: 4.0.48 / 22 February 2025
- Repository: svn.savannah.gnu.org/viewvc/mtools/
- Operating system: Unix-like
- License: GPL-3.0-or-later
- Website: www.gnu.org/software/mtools/

Mtools is a free software collection of utilities to allow a Unix operating system to manipulate files on an MS-DOS file system, typically a floppy disk or floppy disk image.

The mtools are part of the GNU Project and are released under the GNU General Public License (GPL-3.0-or-later).

== Usage ==
The following refers to mtools usage in floppy images. (Useful for virtual machines such as QEMU or VirtualBox.)

Copying a file to floppy image:

$ mcopy -i Disk.img file_source ::file_target

Copying a file from floppy image to the current directory:

$ mcopy -i Disk.img ::file_source file_target

Deleting all files in the disk image

$ mdel -i Disk.img '::*.*'

The drive character : (colon) has a special meaning. It is used to access image files which are directly specified on the command line using the -i options.

== See also ==
- Disk image
