= Garmin .img =

The Garmin .img format is what Garmin devices use to store the maps for its GPS units. The img files contain a header and many subfiles. Img's filestore is based on FAT system. Some old GPS units are not able to work with multiple img files so they need to be merged into one file called gmapsupp.img using programs like Mapsource.

The IMG file contains the needed information for rendering a map on a Garmin GPS unit, and may support autorouting information for those GPS units that offer navigation (i.e. in-car GPS routers and some types of devices intended for hikers).

The .img file is basically a hard-disk image (complete with partition table) containing a filesystem which itself contains subfiles that provide the functionality for the Garmin GPS unit. The filesystem seems to be "flat": that is, it doesn't directly support the concept of subdirectories, however the .GMP subfiles do provide a kind-of subdirectory structure.

Programs that read .img format

- Mapsource
- GPSMapEdit

Programs that write .img format

- CGSPMapper
- Mapwel
- mkgmap

Open Source Tools for .img Format

Garmin IMG Format This program is designed to aid in the decoding of Garmin IMG files. It hexdumps the IMG file side-by-side with plain-text descriptions of what the particular bytes in the file represent.
