= CD-ROM =

Pre-pressed compact disc containing computer data

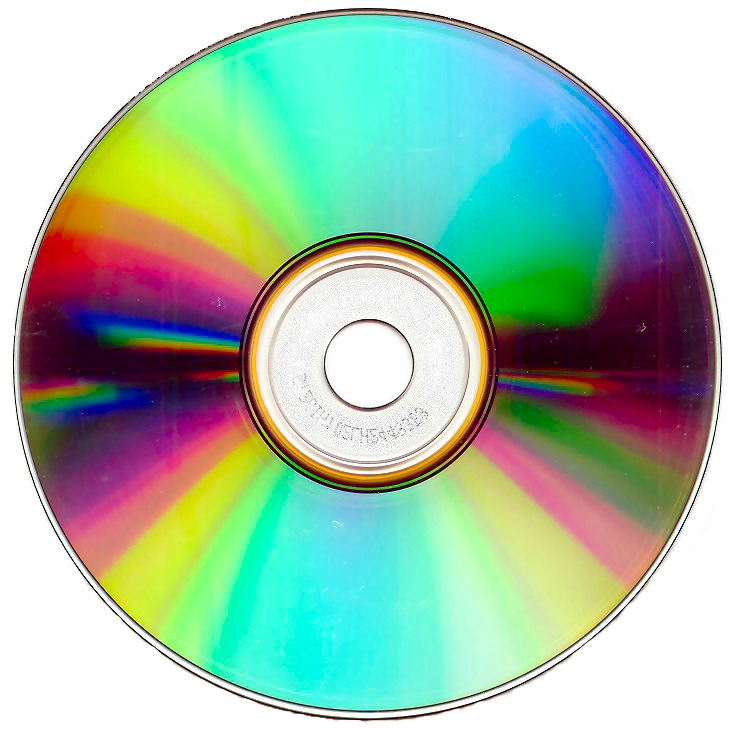
- A traditional CD-ROM
- Media type: Optical disc
- Capacity: 650‍–‍870 MiB
- Read mechanism: 780 nm laser diode, 150‍–‍10,800 KB/s (1‍–‍72×)
- Write mechanism: Pressed mold
- Standard: Yellow Book (ISO/IEC 10149)
- Developed by: Sony · Philips
- Usage: Computer data storage
- Extended to: CD-ROM XA · DVD-ROM
- Released: 1985; 41 years ago

A CD-ROM (/ˌsiːdiːˈrɒm/, compact disc read-only memory) is a type of read-only memory consisting of a pre-pressed optical compact disc that contains data computers can read, but not write or erase. Some CDs, called enhanced CDs, hold both computer data and audio with the latter capable of being played on a CD player, while data (such as software or digital video) is only usable on a computer (such as ISO 9660 format PC CD-ROMs).

During the 1990s and early 2000s, CD-ROMs were popularly used to distribute software and data for computers and fifth generation video game consoles. DVDs as well as downloading started to replace CD-ROMs in these roles starting in the early 2000s, and the use of CD-ROMs for commercial software is now rare.

== History ==
The earliest theoretical work on optical disc storage was done by independent researchers in the United States including David Paul Gregg (1958) and James Russel (1965–1975). In particular, Gregg's patents were used as the basis of the LaserDisc specification that was co-developed between MCA and Philips after MCA purchased Gregg's patents, as well as the company he founded, Gauss Electrophysics. The LaserDisc was the immediate precursor to the CD, with the primary difference being that the LaserDisc encoded information through an analog process whereas the CD used digital encoding.

Key work to digitize the optical disc was performed by Toshi Doi and Kees Schouhamer Immink during 1979–1980, who worked on a taskforce for Sony and Philips. The result was the Compact Disc Digital Audio (CD-DA), defined in 1980. The CD-ROM was later designed as an extension of the CD-DA, and adapted this format to hold any form of digital data, with an initial storage capacity of 553 MB. Sony and Philips created the technical standard that defines the format of a CD-ROM in 1983, in what came to be called the Yellow Book. The CD-ROM was announced in 1984 and introduced by Denon and Sony at the first Japanese COMDEX computer show in 1985. The first CD-ROM drive released to the public, the CM 100, was introduced in July 1985 by Philips. In November 1985, several computer industry participants, including Microsoft, Philips, Sony, Apple and Digital Equipment Corporation, met to create a specification to define a file system format for CD-ROMs. The resulting specification, called the High Sierra format, was published in May 1986. It was eventually standardized, with a few changes, as the ISO 9660 standard in 1988. One of the first products to be made available to the public on CD-ROM was the Grolier Academic Encyclopedia, presented at the Microsoft CD-ROM Conference in March 1986.

CD-ROMs began being used in home video game consoles starting with the PC Engine CD-ROM^{2} (TurboGrafx-CD) in 1988, while CD-ROM drives had also become available for home computers by the end of the 1980s. In 1990, Data East demonstrated an arcade system board that supported CD-ROMs, similar to 1980s LaserDisc video games but with digital data, allowing more flexibility than older LaserDisc games. By early 1990, about 300,000 CD-ROM drives were sold in Japan, while 125,000 CD-ROM discs were being produced monthly in the United States. Some computers that were marketed in the 1990s were called "multimedia" computers because they incorporated a CD-ROM drive, which allowed for the delivery of several hundred megabytes of video, picture, and audio data. The first laptop to have an integrated CD-ROM drive as an option was 1993's CF-V21P by Panasonic; however, the drive only supported mini CDs up to 3.5 inches in diameter. The first notebook to support standard 4.7-inch-diameter discs was IBM's ThinkPad 755CD in 1994.

On early audio CD players that were released prior to the advent of the CD-ROM, the raw binary data of CD-ROM was played back as noise. To address this problem, the subcode channel Q has a "data" flag in areas of the disc that contain computer data rather than playable audio. The data flag instructs CD players to mute the audio.

== CD-ROM discs ==
=== Media ===
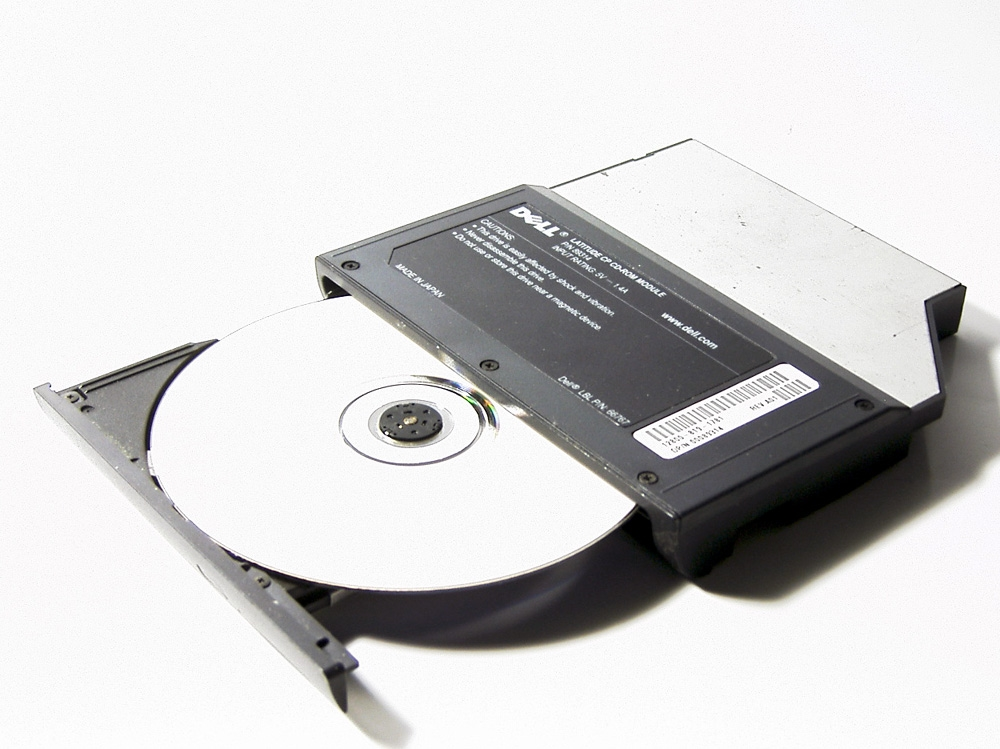
A CD-ROM in the tray of a partially open CD-ROM drive.

CD-ROMs are identical in appearance to audio CDs, and data are stored and retrieved in a very similar manner (only differing from audio CDs in the standards used to store the data). Discs are made from a 1.2 mm thick disc of polycarbonate plastic, with a thin layer of aluminium to make a reflective surface. The most common size of CD-ROM is 120 mm in diameter, though the smaller Mini CD standard with an 80 mm diameter, as well as shaped compact discs in numerous non-standard sizes and molds (e.g., business card-sized media), also exist.

Data is stored on the disc as a series of microscopic indentations called "pits", with the non-indented spaces between them called "lands". A laser is shone onto the reflective surface of the disc to read the pattern of pits and lands. Because the depth of the pits is approximately one-quarter to one-sixth of the wavelength of the laser light used to read the disc, the reflected beam's phase is shifted in relation to the incoming beam, causing destructive interference and reducing the reflected beam's intensity. This is converted into binary data.

=== Standard ===
Several formats are used for data stored on compact discs, known as the Rainbow Books. The Yellow Book, created in 1983, defines the specifications for CD-ROMs, standardized in 1988 as the ISO/IEC 10149 standard and in 1989 as the ECMA-130 standard. The CD-ROM standard builds on top of the original Red Book CD-DA standard for CD audio. Other standards, such as the White Book for Video CDs, further define formats based on the CD-ROM specifications. The Yellow Book itself is not freely available, but the standards with the corresponding content can be downloaded for free from ISO or ECMA.

There are several standards that define how to structure data files on a CD-ROM. ISO 9660 defines the standard file system for a CD-ROM. ISO 13490 is an improvement on this standard which adds support for non-sequential write-once and re-writeable discs such as CD-R and CD-RW, as well as multiple sessions. The ISO 13346 standard was designed to address most of the shortcomings of ISO 9660, and a subset of it evolved into the UDF format, which was adopted for DVDs. A bootable CD specification, called El Torito, was issued in January 1995, to make a CD emulate a hard disk or floppy disk.

=== Manufacture ===
Pre-pressed CD-ROMs are mass-produced by a process of stamping where a glass master disc is created and used to make "stampers", which are in turn used to manufacture multiple copies of the final disc with the pits already present. Recordable (CD-R) and rewritable (CD-RW) discs are manufactured by a different method, whereby the data are recorded on them by a laser changing the properties of a dye or phase transition material in a process that is often referred to as "burning".

== CD-ROM format ==
Data stored on CD-ROMs follows the standard CD data encoding techniques described in the Red Book specification (originally defined for audio CD only). This includes cross-interleaved Reed–Solomon coding (CIRC), eight-to-fourteen modulation (EFM), and the use of pits and lands for coding the bits into the physical surface of the CD.

The structures used to group data on a CD-ROM are also derived from the Red Book. Like audio CDs (CD-DA), a CD-ROM sector contains 2,352 bytes of user data, composed of 98 frames, each consisting of 33 bytes (24 bytes for the user data, 8 bytes for error correction, and 1 byte for the sub code). Unlike audio CDs, the data stored in these sectors corresponds to any type of digital data, not audio samples encoded according to the audio CD specification. To structure, address and protect this data, the CD-ROM standard further defines two sector modes, Mode 1 and Mode 2, which describe two different layouts for the data inside a sector. A track (a group of sectors) inside a CD-ROM only contains sectors in the same mode, but if multiple tracks are present in a CD-ROM, each track can have its sectors in a different mode from the rest of the tracks. They can also coexist with audio CD tracks, which is the case of mixed mode CDs.

=== Sector structure ===
Both Mode 1 and 2 sectors use the first 16 bytes for header information, but differ in the remaining 2,336 bytes due to the use of error correction bytes. Unlike an audio CD, a CD-ROM cannot rely on error concealment by interpolation; a higher reliability of the retrieved data is required. To achieve improved error correction and detection, Mode 1, used mostly for digital data, adds a 32-bit cyclic redundancy check (CRC) code for error detection, and a third layer of Reed–Solomon error correction (Note: The CIRC error correction system used in the CD audio format has two interleaved layers.) using a Reed-Solomon Product-like Code (RSPC). Mode 1 therefore contains 288 bytes per sector for error detection and correction, leaving 2,048 bytes per sector available for data. Mode 2, which is more appropriate for image or video data (where perfect reliability may be a little bit less important), contains no additional error detection or correction bytes, having therefore 2,336 available data bytes per sector. Both modes, like audio CDs, still benefit from the lower layers of error correction at the frame level.

Before being stored on a disc with the techniques described above, each CD-ROM sector is scrambled to prevent some problematic patterns from showing up. These scrambled sectors then follow the same encoding process described in the Red Book in order to be finally stored on a CD.

The following table shows a comparison of the structure of sectors in CD-DA and CD-ROMs:

| Format | ← 2,352 byte sector structure → | | | | | | |
|---|---|---|---|---|---|---|---|
| CD digital audio: | 2,352 (Digital audio) | | | | | | |
| CD-ROM Mode 1: | 12 (Sync pattern) | 3 (Address) | 1 (Mode, 0x01) | 2,048 (Data) | 4 (Error detection) | 8 (Reserved, zero) | 276 (Error correction) |
| CD-ROM Mode 2: | 12 (Sync pattern) | 3 (Address) | 1 (Mode, 0x02) | 2,336 (Data) | | | |

The net byte rate of a Mode-1 CD-ROM, based on comparison to CD-DA audio standards, is 44,100 Hz × 16 bits/sample × 2 channels × 2,048 / 2,352 / 8 = 150 KiB/s (150 × 2^{10}) . This value, 150 KiB/s, is defined as "1× speed". Therefore, for Mode 1 CD-ROMs, a 1× CD-ROM drive reads 150/2 = 75 consecutive sectors per second.

The playing time of a standard CD is 74 minutes, or 4,440 seconds, contained in 333,000 blocks or sectors. Therefore, the net capacity of a Mode-1 CD-ROM is 650 MiB (650 × 2^{20}). For 80 minute CDs, the capacity is 703 MiB.

=== CD-ROM XA extension ===
CD-ROM XA is an extension of the Yellow Book standard for CD-ROMs that combines compressed audio, video and computer data, allowing all to be accessed simultaneously. It was intended as a bridge between CD-ROM and CD-i (Green Book / CD-interactive) and was published by Sony and Philips, and backed by Microsoft, in 1991, first announced in September 1988. "XA" stands for eXtended Architecture.

CD-ROM XA defines two new sector layouts, called Mode 2 Form 1 and Mode 2 Form 2 (which are different from the original Mode 2). XA Mode 2 Form 1 is similar to the Mode 1 structure described above, and can interleave with XA Mode 2 Form 2 sectors; it is used for data. XA Mode 2 Form 2 has 2,324 bytes of user data, and is similar to the standard Mode 2 but with error detection bytes added (though no error correction). It can interleave with XA Mode 2 Form 1 sectors, and it is used for audio/video data. Video CDs, Super Video CDs, Photo CDs, Enhanced Music CDs and CD-i use these sector modes.

The following table shows a comparison of the structure of sectors in CD-ROM XA modes:

| Format | ← 2,352 byte sector structure → | | | | | | |
|---|---|---|---|---|---|---|---|
| CD-ROM XA Mode 2, Form 1: | 12 (Sync pattern) | 3 (Address) | 1 (Mode) | 8 (Subheader) | 2,048 (Data) | 4 (Error detection) | 276 (Error correction) |
| CD-ROM XA Mode 2, Form 2: | 12 (Sync pattern) | 3 (Address) | 1 (Mode) | 8 (Subheader) | 2,324 (Data) | | 4 (Error detection) |

=== Disc images ===
When a disc image of a CD-ROM is created, this can be done in either "raw" mode (extracting 2,352 bytes per sector, independent of the internal structure), or obtaining only the sector's useful data (2,048/2,336/2,352/2,324 bytes depending on the CD-ROM mode). The file size of a disc image created in raw mode is always a multiple of 2,352 bytes (the size of a block). Disc image formats that store raw CD-ROM sectors include CCD/IMG, CUE/BIN, and MDS/MDF. The size of a disc image created from the data in the sectors will depend on the type of sectors it is using. For example, if a CD-ROM mode 1 image is created by extracting only each sector's data, its size will be a multiple of 2,048; this is usually the case for ISO disc images.

On a 74-minute CD-R, it is possible to fit larger disc images using raw mode, up to 333,000 × 2,352 = 783,216,000 bytes (~747 MB). This is the upper limit for raw images created on a 74 min or ≈650 MB Red Book CD. The 14.8% increase is due to the discarding of error correction data.

=== Capacity ===
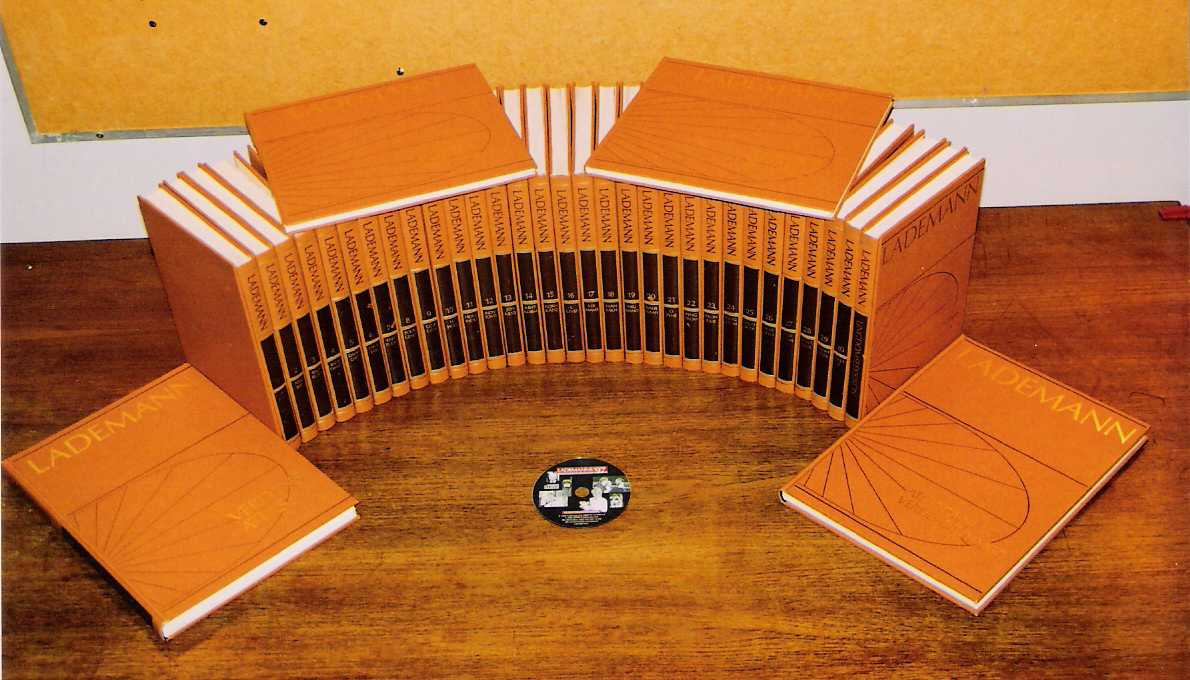
A CD-ROM can easily store the entirety of a paper encyclopedia's words and images, plus audio & video clips

CD-ROM capacities are normally expressed with binary prefixes, subtracting the space used for error correction data. The capacity of a CD-ROM depends on how close the outward data track is extended to the disc's outer rim. A standard 120 mm, 700 MB CD-ROM can actually hold about 703 MB of data with error correction (or 847 MB total). In comparison, a single-layer DVD-ROM can hold 4.7 GB (4.7 × 10^{9} bytes) of error-protected data, more than 6 CD-ROMs.

Capacities of Compact Disc types (90 and 99 minute discs are not standard)
| Type | Sectors | Data (mode 1) max. size | | Audio max. size | Time |
| Type | Sectors | MiB (2^{20}) | MB (10^{6}) | (MiB) | (min) |
|---|---|---|---|---|---|
| 8 cm | 94,500 | 184.570 | 193.536 | 211.967 | 21 |
| 553 MB | 283,500 | 553.711 | 580.608 | 635.902 | 63 |
| 650 MB | 333,000 | 650.391 | 681.984 | 746.933 | 74 |
| 700 MB | 360,000 | 703.125 | 737.280 | 807.495 | 80 |
| 800 MB | 405,000 | 791.016 | 829.440 | 908.432 | 90 |
| 900 MB | 445,500 | 870.117 | 912.384 | 999.275 | 99 |
Mebibyte (MiB) and minute (min) values are exact; Megabyte (MB) values are approximate.

== CD-ROM drives ==
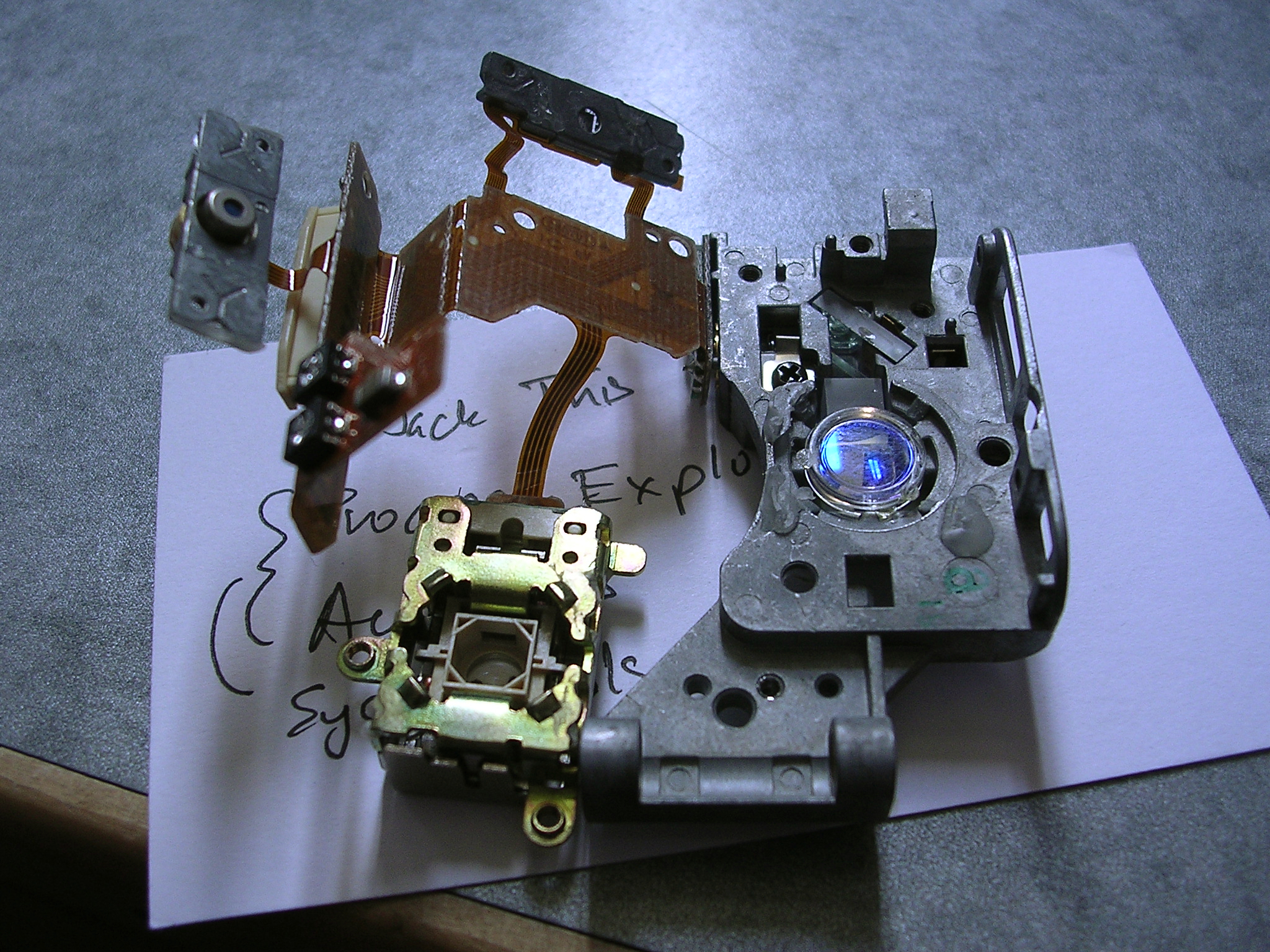
A view of a CD-ROM drive's disassembled laser system

The movement of the laser enables reading at any position of the CD.

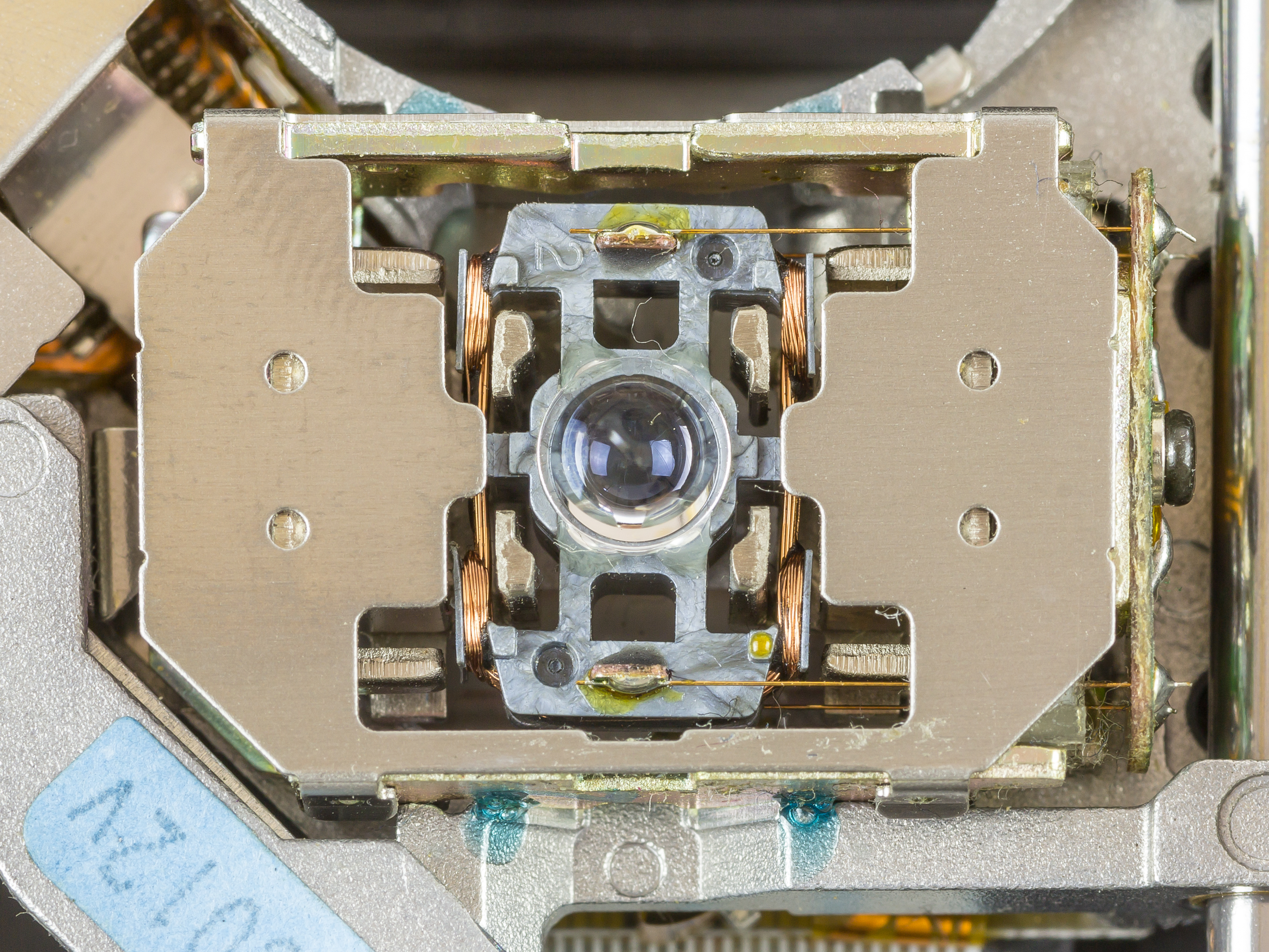
The laser system of a CD-ROM drive

CD-ROM discs are read using CD-ROM drives. A CD-ROM drive may be connected to the computer via a PATA, SCSI, SATA, FireWire, or USB interface or a proprietary interface, such as the Panasonic CD interface, LMSI/Philips, Sony and Mitsumi standards. Virtually all modern CD-ROM drives can also play audio CDs (as well as Video CDs and other data standards) when used with the right software.

=== Laser and optics ===
CD-ROM drives employ a near-infrared 780 nm laser diode. The laser beam is directed onto the disc via an opto-electronic tracking module, which then detects whether the beam has been reflected or scattered.

=== Transfer rates ===
==== Original speed ====
CD-ROM drives are rated with a speed factor relative to music CDs. If a Mode 1 CD-ROM is read at the same rotational speed as an audio CD, the data transfer rate is 150 Kbyte/s, commonly called "1×" (with constant linear velocity, short "CLV"). At this data rate, the track moves along under the laser spot at about 1.2 m/s. To maintain this linear velocity as the optical head moves to different positions, the angular velocity is varied from about 500 rpm at the inner edge to 200 rpm at the outer edge. The 1× speed rating for CD-ROM (150 Kbyte/s) is different from the 1× speed rating for DVDs (1.32 MB/s).

==== Speed advancements ====
When the speed at which the disc is spun is increased, data can be transferred at greater rates. For example, a CD-ROM drive that can read at 8× speed spins the disc at 1600 to 4000 rpm, giving a linear velocity of 9.6 m/s and a transfer rate of 1200 Kbyte/s. Above 12× speed most drives read at Constant angular velocity (CAV, constant rpm) so that the motor is not made to change from one speed to another as the head seeks from place to place on the disc. In CAV mode the "×" number denotes the transfer rate at the outer edge of the disc, where it is a maximum. 20× was thought to be the maximum speed due to mechanical constraints until Samsung Electronics introduced the SCR-3230, a 32× CD-ROM drive which uses a ball bearing system to balance the spinning disc in the drive to reduce vibration and noise. As of 2004, the fastest transfer rate commonly available was about 52× or 10,400 rpm and 7.62 MB/s. Higher spin speeds are limited by the strength of the polycarbonate plastic of which the discs are made. At 52×, the linear velocity of the outermost part of the disc is around 65 m/s. However, improvements can still be obtained using multiple laser pickups as demonstrated by the Kenwood TrueX 72× which uses seven laser beams and a rotation speed of approximately 10×.

The first 12× drive was released in late 1996. Above 12× speed, there are problems with vibration and heat. CAV drives give speeds up to 30× at the outer edge of the disc with the same rotational speed as a standard (constant linear velocity, CLV) 12×, or 32× with a slight increase. However, due to the nature of CAV (linear speed at the inner edge is still only 12×, increasing smoothly in-between) the actual throughput increase is less than 30/12; in fact, roughly 20× average for a completely full disc, and even less for a partially filled one.

==== Physical limitations ====
Problems with vibration, owing to limits on achievable symmetry and strength in mass-produced media, mean that CD-ROM drive speeds have not massively increased since the late 1990s. Over 10 years later, commonly available drives vary between 24× (slimline and portable units, 10× spin speed) and 52× (typically CD- and read-only units, 21× spin speed), all using CAV to achieve their claimed "max" speeds, with 32× through 48× most common. Even so, these speeds can cause poor reading (drive error correction having become very sophisticated in response) and even shattering of poorly made or physically damaged media, with small cracks rapidly growing into catastrophic breakages when centripetally stressed at 10,000–13,000 rpm (i.e. 40–52× CAV). High rotational speeds also produce undesirable noise from disc vibration, rushing air and the spindle motor itself. Most 21st-century drives allow forced low speed modes (by use of small utility programs) for the sake of safety, accurate reading or silence, and will automatically fall back if numerous sequential read errors and retries are encountered.

==== Workarounds ====
Other methods of improving read speed were trialled such as using multiple optical beams, increasing throughput up to 72× with a 10× spin speed, but along with other technologies like 90~99 minute recordable media, GigaRec and double-density compact disc (Purple Book standard) recorders, their utility was nullified by the introduction of consumer DVD-ROM drives capable of consistent 36× equivalent CD-ROM speeds (4× DVD) or higher. Additionally, with a 700 MB CD-ROM fully readable in under 2.5 minutes at 52× CAV, increases in actual data transfer rate are decreasingly influential on overall effective drive speed when taken into consideration with other factors such as loading/unloading, media recognition, spin up/down and random seek times, making for much decreased returns on development investment. A similar stratification effect has since been seen in DVD development where maximum speed has stabilised at 16× CAV (with exceptional cases between 18× and 22×) and capacity at 4.3 and 8.5 GB (single and dual layer), with higher speed and capacity needs instead being catered to by Blu-ray drives.

==== Speed ratings ====
CD-Recordable drives are often sold with three different speed ratings: one speed for write-once operations, one for re-write operations, and one for read-only operations. The speeds are typically listed in that order; i.e. a 12×/10×/32× CD drive can write to CD-R discs at 12× speed (1.76 MB/s), write to CD-RW discs at 10× speed (1.46 MB/s), and read from CDs at 32× speed (4.69 MB/s), if the CPU and media player software permit speeds that high.

==== Speed table ====
Common data transfer speeds for CD-ROM drives
| Transfer speed | KB/s | Mbit/s | MB/s (Note: To three significant figures.) | RPM (outer to inner edge) |
|---|---|---|---|---|
| 1× | 150 | 1.2288 | 0.146 | 200–530 |
| 2× | 300 | 2.4576 | 0.293 | 400–1,060 |
| 4× | 600 | 4.9152 | 0.586 | 800–2,120 |
| 8× | 1,200 | 9.8304 | 1.17 | 1,600–4,240 |
| 10× | 1,500 | 12.288 | 1.46 | 2,000–5,300 |
| 12× | 1,800 | 14.7456 | 1.76 | 2,400–6,360 |
| 20× | 1,200–3,000 | up to 24.576 | up to 2.93 | 4,000 (CAV) |
| 24× | 1,440–3,600 | up to 29.491 | up to 3.51 | 4,800 (CAV) |
| 32× | 1,920–4,800 | up to 39.3216 | up to 4.69 | 6,400 (CAV) |
| 36× | 2,160–5,400 | up to 44.2368 | up to 5.27 | 7,200 (CAV) |
| 40× | 2,400–6,000 | up to 49.152 | up to 5.86 | 8,000 (CAV) |
| 48× | 2,880–7,200 | up to 58.9824 | up to 7.03 | 9,600 (CAV) |
| 52× | 3,120–7,800 | up to 63.8976 | up to 7.62 | 10,400 (CAV) |
| 56× | 3,360–8,400 | up to 68.8128 | up to 8.20 | 11,200 (CAV) |
| 72× | 6,750–10,800 | up to 88.4736 | up to 10.5 | 2,700 (multi-beam) |

A 2003 MythBusters episode erroneously claims that a CD spinning at "52× speed" spins at 30,000 rotations per minute (rpm). This miscalculation is caused by assuming a linear velocity of 52× at the inner edge of the data area of the disc, which would indeed reach dangerous speeds of over 25,000 rpm, therefore optical drives never spin discs at such speeds. In actuality, a speed of "52×" are approximately 10,000 rpm, given that drives are advertised with their angular velocities. The angular velocity is the measured as the linear velocity at the outermost edge of the disc, where the linear velocity (and accordingly the data transfer rate) is roughly 2.5 times higher than at the innermost edge of the data area.

== Copyright issues ==
Software distributors, and in particular distributors of computer games, often make use of various copy protection schemes to prevent software running from any media besides the original CD-ROMs. This differs somewhat from audio CD protection in that it is usually implemented in both the media and the software itself. The CD-ROM itself may contain "weak" sectors to make copying the disc more difficult, and additional data that may be difficult or impossible to copy to a CD-R or disc image, but which the software checks for each time it is run to ensure an original disc and not an unauthorized copy is present in the computer's CD-ROM drive.

Manufacturers of CD writers (CD-R or CD-RW) are encouraged by the music industry to ensure that every drive they produce has a unique identifier, which will be encoded by the drive on every disc that it records: the RID or Recorder Identification Code. This is a counterpart to the Source Identification Code (SID), an eight character code beginning with "IFPI" that is usually stamped on discs produced by CD recording plants.

== See also ==
- ATA Packet Interface (ATAPI) – Protocol that carries SCSI commands over Parallel ATA
- CD/DVD authoring
- Compact Disc Digital Audio – Data format used for audio compact discs
- Computer hardware
- DVD-Audio – DVD format for storing high-fidelity audio
- DVD-ROM – Digital optical disc data storage format
- List of optical disc manufacturers
- MultiLevel Recording – Proposed technology to increase the capacity of optical discs
- Optical disc drive – Type of computer disk storage drive
- History of optical recording
- Phase-change Dual – Rewritable optical disc standard
- Thor-CD – Failed CD format proposal
