= CD-Text =

CD-based format that allows for song information to be stored alongside audio data

- Media type: Optical disc
- Encoding: 2 channels of LPCM audio, plus ITTS data
- Read mechanism: 780 nm laser diode
- Standard: Red Book
- Developed by: Philips & Sony
- Usage: Audio storage
- Extended from: CD-DA

CD-Text is an extension of the Red Book Compact Disc specifications standard for audio CDs. It allows storage of additional information (e.g. album name, song name, and artist name) on a standards-compliant audio CD.

The specification for CD-Text was included in the Multi-Media Commands Set 3 R01 (MMC-3) standard, released in September 1996 and backed by Sony. It was also added to new revisions of the Red Book. The actual text is stored in a format compatible with Interactive Text Transmission System (ITTS), defined in the IEC 61866 standard. The ITTS standard is also applied in the MiniDisc format, as well as in Digital Audio Broadcasting technology and Digital Compact Cassette.

== Storage ==
The CD-Text information is stored in the subchannels R to W on the disc. This information is usually stored in the subchannels in the lead-in area of the disc, where there is roughly 5 kilobytes of space available. It can also be stored on the main program area of the disc (where the audio tracks are), which can store about 31 megabytes. Since the R to W channels are not used in the Red Book specification of audio CDs, they are not read by all CD players, which prevents some devices from reading CD-Text information.

== Format ==
CD-text data is defined in a scattered manner between MMC-3 and Sony documentation. The information below uses GNU libcdio's description.

On the lowest level, CD-text is stored in 18-byte "pack" units; this part is defined in MMC-3 Annex J. Each pack consists of 4 bytes of header—type indicator, track number reference, sequential counter, block number and character position indicator (BNCPI); 12 bytes of payload; and 2 bytes of CRC. The type indicator ranges from 0x80 to 0x8F, the 13 defined values being:

CD-Text keywords
Type	Keyword	Description	Section	Format
0x84	ARRANGER	Name(s) of the arranger(s)	Any	Character
0x83	COMPOSER	Name(s) of the composer(s)	Any	Character
0x86	DISK_ID	Disc Identification information	Disc	Binary
0x87	GENRE	Genre Identification and Genre information	Disc	Binary
0x8e	ISRC	International Standard Recording Code of each track	Track	Character
0x85	MESSAGE	Message from the content provider and/or artist	Any	Character
0x81	PERFORMER	Name(s) of the performer(s)	Any	Character
0x82	SONGWRITER	Name(s) of the songwriter(s)	Any	Character
0x80	TITLE	Title of album name or track titles	Any	Character
0x88	TOC_INFO	Table-of-content information	Disc	Binary
0x89	TOC_INFO2	Second table-of-content information	Disc	Binary
0x8e	UPC_EAN	UPC/EAN code of the album	Disc	Character
0x8f	SIZE_INFO	Size information of the block	Any	Binary

The BNPCI is used to define information that does not fit in one pack. This can be text or binary data. The BNCPI also indicates whether the text is single-byte or double-byte data in the top bit. This determines how null-terminated strings are defined – one or two bytes of 0x00. The DBCS mode is rarely, if ever, used. Its special null handling is not necessary for computer DBCS code pages, as they are "hybrid" with ASCII and compatible in the NUL behavior. UTF-16 could be the intended use.

For block types listed above as "character" (per MMC-3), the payload is a simple null-terminated string. (MMC-3 is written confusingly here – it describes the encoding as "ASCII" in the pack type table despite mentioning the BNCPI flag modifying its behavior later.) The descriptions of the binary fields are vague, but the developers of GNU libcdio have either matched them to sections of MMC-3 or written new descriptions based on Sony's sample.

Another layer of encoding specification is found at this payload level, in the SIZE_INFO block. Here the first byte may be used to indicate the encoding, ASCII, Latin-1, or "MS-JIS". This is supported by the original Sony authoring tools.

== See also ==
- CD+G
- CDVU+
- ID3
- Vorbis comment
