= DiscJuggler =

Optical disc authoring software

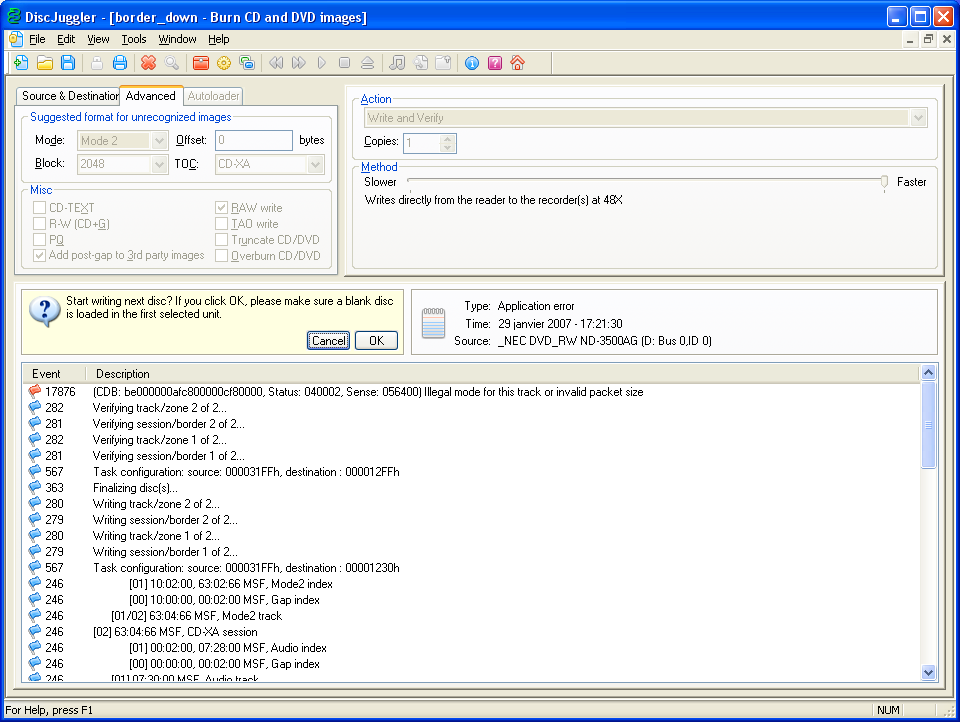
- DiscJuggler Screenshot
- Developers: Padus, Inc.
- Stable release: 6.00.1400 / April 18, 2006; 20 years ago
- Operating system: Microsoft Windows
- Type: Optical disc authoring software
- License: Shareware
- Website: www.padus.com

DiscJuggler was a professional CD/DVD recording software program, able to duplicate multiple CDs at once with its ability to simultaneously drive multiple CD recorders and replicate virtually any existing standard CD. It is widely used for burning Dreamcast disc images, known by having a .cdi file extension. The software operated on Microsoft Windows.

== See also ==
- Standard (warez)#Dreamcast
