= Virtual disk and virtual drive =

Software components that emulate an actual disk storage device

Virtual disk and virtual drive are software components that emulate an actual disk storage device.

Virtual disks and virtual drives are common components of virtual machines in hardware virtualization, but they are also widely used for various purposes unrelated to virtualization, such as for the creation of logical disks, software development, testing environments, and data management. They offer flexibility, ease of management, and the ability to simulate different storage environments without needing the corresponding physical hardware.

== Operation ==
A virtual drive is a software component that emulates an actual disk drive. To other programs, a virtual drive looks and behaves like an actual physical device.

In modern operating systems, all storage media appears to programs as device drivers, which abstract away the physical implementation differences between different storage media. Consequently, a virtual drive is a device driver with an additional layer of abstraction between the interface and the underlying physical storage medium.

A virtual disk may be in any of the following forms:

- Disk image, a computer file that contains the exact data structure of an actual storage device
- Logical disk (also known as vdisk), a software defined division of physical hard drives.
  - A hybrid volume composed of two or more physical disks.
  - A single hard drive, or disk partition, with subdivisions defined by the operating system, instead of the device itself.
- RAM disk, which stores its data in random-access memory (RAM) instead of on a storage device
- A mapped network drive that connects to a File Server

== Uses ==
In hardware virtualization, virtual machines implement virtual drives as part of their efforts to emulate the behavior of an actual machine. As with an ordinary computer, a virtual machine needs one virtual drive and one disk image to start up, except when it is performing a network boot. More virtual drives are added as needed.

Virtual optical drives are used on physical computers to transfer the contents of the optical disks onto hard disk drives. Doing so helps in resolving the problem of the short life span of CDs and DVDs and takes advantage of the faster data transfer rate of hard disk drives. However, virtual optical drives are also used for software piracy: early computer games used disc existence verification to ensure licensed use, which can be circumvented using virtual optical drives.

As a countermeasure, the StarForce copy protection scheme attempts to thwart disc virtualization. Modern video games have migrated to online product activation as part of their distribution process.

== See also ==
- Comparison of disc image software
- Floating drive
- Removable media
- Storage virtualization
