= Optical disc image =

Archive file of an optical disc

ISO 9660 image
- Filename extensions: .iso, .udf
- Internet media type: application/vnd.efi.iso
- Uniform Type Identifier (UTI): public.iso-image
- Magic number: Volume descriptor: CD001 at 32769. NSR0 at 38913 or 32769 for UDF.
- Type of format: Disk image
- Standard: ISO 9660, UDF

An optical disc image (or ISO image, from the ISO 9660 file system used with CD-ROM media) is a disk image that contains everything that would be written to an optical disc, disk sector by disc sector, including the optical disc file system. ISO images contain the binary image of an optical media file system (usually ISO 9660 and its extensions or UDF), including the data in its files in binary format, copied exactly as they were stored on the disc. The data inside the ISO image will be structured according to the file system that was used on the optical disc from which it was created.

ISO images can be created from optical discs by disk imaging software, or from a collection of files by optical disc authoring software, or from a different disk image file by means of conversion. Software distributed on bootable discs is often available for download in ISO image format; like any other ISO image, it may be written to an optical disc such as CD, DVD and Blu-Ray.

== Description ==
Optical-disc images are uncompressed and do not use a particular container format; they are a sector-by-sector copy of the data on an optical disc, stored inside a binary file. Other than ISO 9660 media, an ISO image might also contain a UDF (ISO/IEC 13346) file system (commonly used by DVDs and Blu-ray Discs), including the data in its files in binary format, copied exactly as they were stored on the disc. The data inside the ISO image will be structured according to the file system that was used on the optical disc from which it was created.

The .iso file extension is the one most commonly used for this type of disc images. The .img extension can also be found on some ISO image files, such as in some images from Microsoft DreamSpark; however, IMG files, which also use the .img extension, tend to have slightly different contents. The .udf file extension is sometimes used to indicate that the file system inside the ISO image is actually UDF and not ISO 9660.

ISO files store only the user data from each sector on an optical disc, ignoring the control headers and error correction data, and are therefore slightly smaller than a raw disc image of optical media. Since the size of the user-data portion of a sector (logical sector) in data optical discs is 2,048 bytes, the size of an ISO image will be a multiple of 2,048.

Any single-track CD-ROM, DVD or Blu-ray disc can be archived in ISO format as a true digital copy of the original. Unlike a physical optical disc, an image can be transferred over any data link or removable storage medium. An ISO image can be opened with almost every multi-format file archiver. Native support for handling ISO images varies from operating system to operating system.

With a suitable driver software, an ISO can be "mounted" – allowing the operating system to interface with it, just as if the ISO were a physical optical disc. Most Unix-based operating systems, including Linux and macOS, have this built-in capability to mount an ISO. Versions of Windows, beginning with Windows 8, also have such a capability. For other operating systems, separately available software drivers can be installed to achieve the same objective.

== Multiple-track images ==
A CD can have multiple tracks, which can contain computer data, audio, or video. File systems such as ISO 9660 are stored inside one of these tracks. Since ISO images are expected to contain a binary copy of the file system and its contents, there is no concept of a "track" inside an ISO image, since a track is a container for the contents of an ISO image. This means that CDs with multiple tracks cannot be stored inside a single ISO image; at most, an ISO image will contain the data inside one of those multiple tracks, and only if it is stored inside a standard file system.

This also means that audio CDs, which are usually composed of multiple tracks, can not be stored inside an ISO image. Furthermore, not even a single track of an audio CD can be stored as an ISO image, since audio tracks do not contain a file system inside them, but only a continuous stream of encoded audio data. This audio is stored on sectors of 2352 bytes different from those that store a file system and it is not stored inside files; it is addressed with track numbers, index points and a CD time code that are encoded into the lead-in of each session of the CD-Audio disc.

Video CDs and Super Video CDs require at least two tracks on a CD, so it is also not possible to store an image of one of these discs inside an ISO image file, however an .IMG file can achieve this.

Formats such as CUE/BIN, CCD/IMG and MDS/MDF formats can be used to store multi-track disc images, including audio CDs. These formats store a raw disc image of the complete disc, including information from all tracks, along with a companion file describing the multiple tracks and the characteristics of each of those tracks. This would allow an optical media burning tool to have all the information required to correctly burn the image on a new disc. For audio CDs, one can also transfer the audio data into uncompressed audio files like WAV or AIFF, optionally reserving the metadata (see CD ripping).

Most software that is capable of writing from ISO images to hard disks or recordable media (CD / DVD / BD) is generally not able to write from ISO disk images to flash drives. This limitation is more related to the availability of software tools able to perform this task, than to problems in the format itself. However, since 2011, various software has existed to write raw image files to USB flash drives.

== Uses ==
.iso files are commonly used in emulators to replicate a CD image. Emulators such as Dolphin and PCSX2 use .iso files to emulate Wii and GameCube games, and PlayStation 2 games, respectively. They can also be used as virtual CD-ROMs for hypervisors such as VMware Workstation or VirtualBox. Other uses are burning disk images of operating systems to physical install media.

== See also ==
- ISO 13490 – Optical disc file system standard, successor to ISO 9660
- Comparison of disc image software
- Live USB – USB drive with a full bootable operating system
- No-disc crack – Disc copy protection circumvention
