= Track (optical disc) =

Optical disc subdivision

On an optical disc, a track (CD) or title (DVD) is a subdivision of its content. Specifically, it is a consecutive set of sectors (called timecode frames on audio tracks) on the disc containing a block of data. One session may contain one or more tracks of the same or different types. There are several kinds of tracks, and there is also a sub-track index for finding points within a track.

Blu-ray discs can also be written in a sequential, session-based mode modelled on CD and DVD. A Blu-ray track refer to the entire physical storage of a Blu-ray layer; the equivalent to tracks in CD sessions is called a logical track.

== Audio tracks ==
Audio tracks are defined in the Red Book specification for CD Digital Audio (which was the first CD specification). One song or movement usually comprises one audio track, containing audio in the form of raw PCM samples in 16 bit/44.1 kHz resolution in 2 channels, and a subcode multiplexed with the audio data. In this mode, each sector (called a frame) consists of 2352 bytes of audio data (1176 16-bit samples, or 588 stereo samples), which equals 1/75 second of audio (therefore SMPTE time code equivalent for the audio data consists of hour:minute:sec:frame, where frame ranges from 0 to 74). CIRC error correction is used for the data.

=== Sector structure ===
Each sector (or timecode frame) consists of a sequence of channel frames. These frames, when read from the disc, are made of a 24-bit synchronization pattern with the constant sequence 1000-0000-0001-0000-0000-0010, not present anywhere else on the disc, separated by three merging bits, followed by 33 bytes in EFM encoding, each followed by 3 merge bits. This forms a 588-bit long structure (24 + 3 + 33 × (14 + 3)) called channel frame. The 33 bytes in the channel frame are composed of 24 bytes of user data, 8 bytes of parity, and 1 byte of subcode data.

=== Subchannels ===
The 98 channel frames, which make up the 2352 (98 × 24) byte sectors (or frames) contain 98 bytes of subchannel data, of which 96 bytes are usable. The subchannel bytes are further divided to individual bits, labeled PQRSTUVW, from most to least significant bit, and forming eight parallel bitstreams called channels, subcode channels, or subchannels. These are used to control addressing and playback of the CD.

=== Indices ===
Each CD track has an index; however, it is rare to find a CD player that displays or can access this feature, except occasionally in pro audio equipment, usually for radio broadcasting. Every track at least has index 1, and often has a pre-gap which is index 0. Additional songs, such as hidden tracks, may have index 2 or 3.

== Video tracks ==
On a DVD, each track is called a title, because it is intended to hold a single movie title, or episode of a TV series. Extra content and bonus features on a DVD are also on separate tracks or titles. The sub-track index is called a chapter, like a chapter in a book. This was inherited from its predecessor the LaserDisc, which contained only one title divided into chapters.

== Data tracks ==
The Compact Disc specification (as defined in the Red Book) was originally intended for storing digital audio, but mainstream applications for optical disc storage have since expanded to other uses as well. One such extension, the Yellow Book, defines the CD-ROM specification -- a standardized method of storing arbitrary digital data in a CD track. At a low level, the resulting data track does not differ significantly from an audio CD track, other than the interpretation of the data within. Because of this, it is possible to play back CD-ROM data on an audio CD player. However, the data on these tracks are not coherent audio samples -- that is, where each sample typically has a high degree of correlation to the one previous, and to the next. As such, the apparent randomness of encoded sample values tends to manifest as white noise, similar to the static of an untuned analog TV or radio receiver. The high amplitude and atypical frequency distribution (with excessive spectral density in the high frequencies, as compared to that commonly found in meaningful audio) is often unpleasant, and can, potentially, exceed the thermal limitations of speakers, causing damage if left to play at a high enough volume. Consequently, many CD players manufactured from the late 1990s onwards will mute the audio output when they detect a data track. Some discs -- for example, for game consoles such as the Sega Dreamcast -- contain a supplementary Red Book audio track warning the listener against playing the data tracks.

== Sessions ==
The Orange Book specification added the concept of sessions to CDs (the original specs for CD-DA and CD-ROM implicitly assume only one session per disc). Each session has the three areas that are included in the original structure for CD-DA and CD-ROM: a lead-in containing the session's table of contents; a program holding individual tracks (the information being stored); and a lead-out to mark the end of the session.

If a disc has multiple sessions, each session has this same structure (lead-in, program area, and lead-out). In these discs, the lead-in areas contain addresses of the previous sessions. The table of contents (TOC) in the lead-in of the latest session is used to access the tracks. Each session must have at least one track. The first lead-out is 6750 sectors (about 13 megabytes) long; each subsequent lead-out is 2250 sectors (4 megabytes) long.

The following table shows the structure of a multi-session CD:

Session level	Session 1					Session 2					...
Track level	Lead in (with TOC)	Track 1	Track 2	...	Lead out	Lead in (with TOC)	Track 1	Track 2	...	Lead out	...

In sequential Blu-ray discs, session ranges are recorded in a Sequential Recording Range Information (SRRI) field of a Disc Management Area (DMA). Sessions contain logical tracks, which can be split to create new tracks. A final, invisible session holds free space in a single logical track, called the invisible/incomplete track. When a disc is finalized or closed, the latest information in the temporary DMAs such as SRRI is taken and copied into the DMA.
