= CloneCD =

Optical disc authoring software

- Screenshot of CloneCD
- Original author: Oliver Kastl
- Developer: RedFox
- Release: 1999
- Stable release: 5.3.4.0 / May 16, 2016; 10 years ago
- Operating system: Windows
- Type: CD Copying
- License: Proprietary
- Website: https://www.redfox.bz/clonecd.html

CloneCD is proprietary optical disc authoring software for ripping music and data CDs and DVDs, capable of making exact, 1:1 copies even of copy protected discs, bypassing several types of digital rights management (DRM).

CloneCD can rip discs to create disk image in its own file format, CloneCD Control File (.ccd), which is capable of storing disc subcode data.

CloneCD was originally written by Oliver Kastl and offered by Swiss company Elaborate Bytes, but due to changes in European copyright law, they were forced to take it off the market. The last version of CloneCD made by Elaborate Bytes was version 4.2.0.2. The software was subsequently sold by SlySoft, a company located in Antigua and Barbuda, whose legislation does not ban the circumvention of DRM schemes. Since 2016, it is sold by Belize/Latvia based RedFox.

As of June 2024 CloneCD is no longer available for purchase and appears to be abandoned.

== Region restrictions in older versions ==
In older versions of "CloneCD", the features "Amplify Weak Sectors", "Protected PC Games", and "Hide CDR Media" were disabled in the United States of America and Japan. Changing the region and language settings in Windows (e. g. to Canadian English) and/or patches could unlock these features in the two countries. SlySoft decided to leave these options disabled for the US for legal reasons, but no features were disabled. The current version of CloneCD is not region-restricted.

== See also ==
- CD ripper
- CloneCD Control File
- List of disk imaging software
- List of Compact Disc and DVD copy protection schemes
- Comparison of ISO image software
