= Nero Burning ROM =

Optical disc authoring program

- Developer: Nero AG
- Initial release: 1997; 29 years ago
- Stable release: 2024 (26.0.1.4) (November 1, 2023; 2 years ago) [±]
- Operating system: Microsoft Windows
- Type: Optical disc authoring software
- License: Trialware
- Website: www.nero.com

Nero Burning ROM, commonly called Nero, is an optical disc authoring program from Nero AG. The software is part of the Nero Multimedia Suite but is also available as a stand-alone product. It is used for burning and copying optical media such as CDs, DVDs, and Blu-ray disks. The program also supports the label printing technologies LightScribe and LabelFlash, and can be used to convert audio files into other audio formats.

== Name ==
Nero Burning ROM is a pun in reference to Roman emperor Nero, who was rumored to have ordered the Great Fire of Rome. The software's logo features a burning Colosseum, though this is an anachronism as it was not built until after Nero's death.

== Features ==
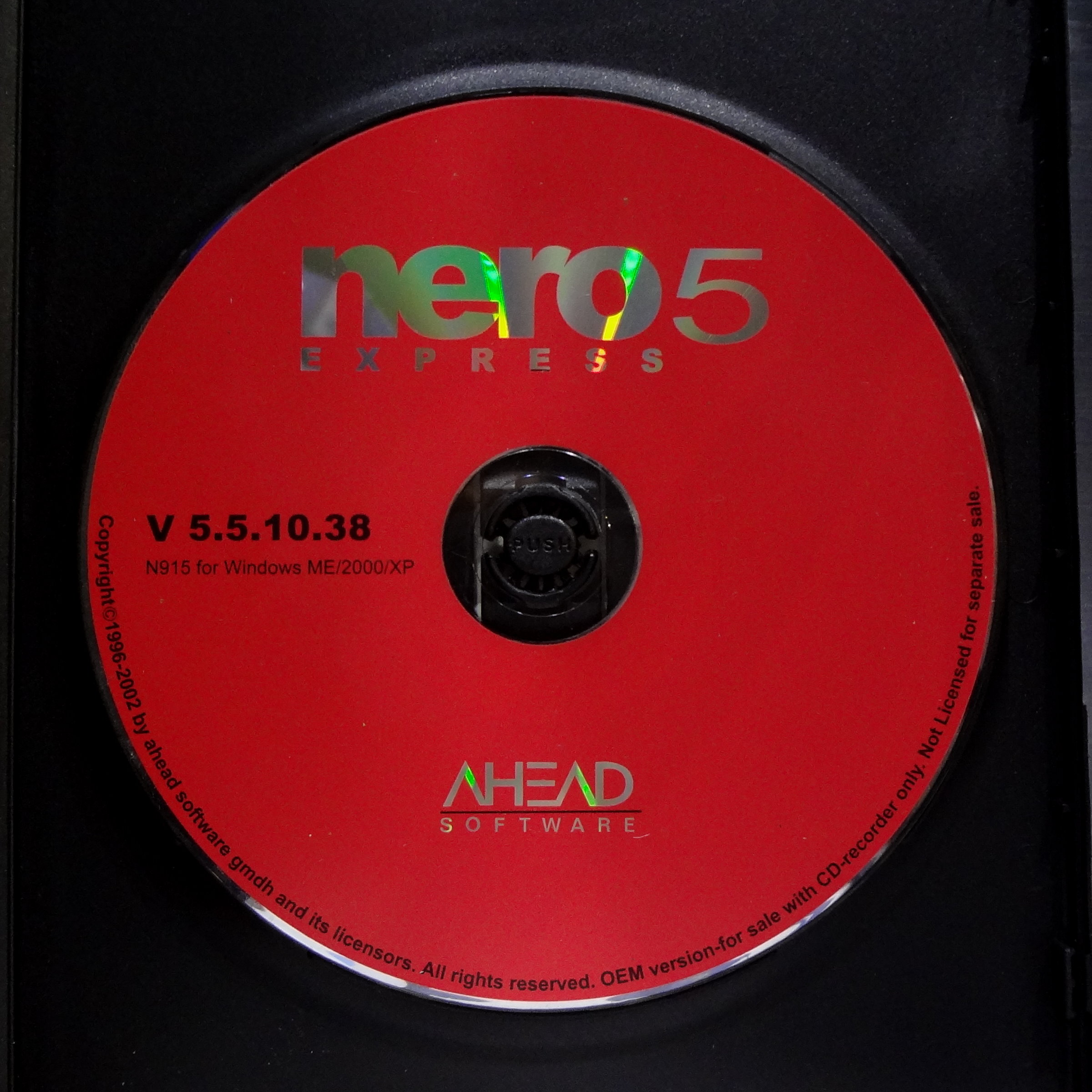
Nero Express 5.5.10.38 OEM version

Nero Burning ROM is only available for Microsoft Windows. A Linux-compatible version was available from 2005 to 2012, but it has since been discontinued. In newer versions, media can be added to compilations via the Nero MediaBrowser. Nero AirBurn, a new feature in Nero 2015, enables users to burn media straight from their mobile devices. The latest version is Nero Burning ROM 2017 released in October 2016 including SecurDisc 4.0 with 256-bit encryption.

The software supports the creation of a variety of media formats:

- Disk image files
- Audio CD discs
- DVD-Video discs
- Blu-ray Discs
- AVCHD video discs
- Bootable data discs
- ISO/UDF data discs
- SecurDisc discs

Additional functions include:

- Printing on discs with LightScribe and LabelFlash technology
- Erasing rewritable discs
- Copying audio CD tracks in a choice of audio formats onto a hard disk drive
- Converting audio files to other audio file formats
- Connection to the online music database Gracenote

== Image format support ==
Nero Burning ROM works with a number of optical disc image formats, including the raw uncompressed image using the ISO9660 standard and Nero's proprietary NRG file format. Depending on the version, additional image formats may be supported. To use non-natively supported formats such as lossless FLAC, Wavpack, and Shorten, additional program modules must be installed. The modules are also known as plug-ins and codecs and are usually free, although Nero AG sells some proprietary video and audio plug-ins. Standard CD images created by Nero products have the filename extension .NRG, but users can also create and burn normal ISO images.

== Varieties ==
Nero Burning ROM is integrated in the Nero Multimedia Suite and is also available as a downloadable standalone product. It is also a part of Nero Essentials – a slimmed-down version of Nero Multimedia Suite – that comes bundled with OEM computers and optical disc writers.

== Version history ==
=== Nero Burning ROM ===
Version Number	Nero Application Release Date	Notes
Nero Burning ROM
1.0	1997	Only release of version 1.
Nero Burning ROM 2
2.0.0.0	1997	First release of version 2.
2.0.1.5	1997	Last release of version 2.
Nero Burning ROM 3
3.0.0.0	1997	First release of version 3.
3.0.7.1	1998	Last release of version 3.
Nero Burning ROM 4
4.0.0.2	1999	First release of version 4. CD-ROM UDF and UDF/ISO (Bridge) support added. Nero Cover Editor.
4.0.3.0	1999	Last version for Windows 3.x (requires Win32s).
4.0.9.1	20 March 2000	Last release of version 4. New features include twin VQ Encoding/Decoding, audio echo filter, and audio drag & drop implemented for Windows 2000.
Nero Burning ROM 5
5.0.0.3	2000	First release of version 5.
5.5	30 April 2001	Major update. New features included Nero Wave Editor, Advanced Nero Cover Designer, Nero MPEG1 Video Encoder, VCD/SVCD Menu Creation, Audio Plug-In Interface, Embedded Nero API (Application Program Interface), Nero Toolkit.
5.5.4.0	25 August 2001	First version to support DVD burning.
5.5.9.0	4 July 2002	The first version with codec plug-in support (for example, writing FLAC, WavPack, MP4 etc. files to Audio CDs), Windows XP Support.
5.5.10.56	2 March 2004	Last release of version 5. Last version for Windows 95A. Nero 6 requires Windows 95B/98 or later.
Nero Burning ROM 6
6.0.0.9	25 July 2003	First release of version 6. Early versions of Nero version 6 would burn only data DVDs using the ISO 9660 file system. Though DVD drives seemed to have no difficulty reading single-layer discs, compatibility with dual-layer discs was problematic.
6.3.1.25	18 June 2004	Last version for Windows NT 4.0.
6.6.0.8	17 February 2005	Added LightScribe support.
6.6.1.15c	31 July 2007	Last release of version 6.
Nero Burning ROM 7
7.0.1.2	31 October 2005	First release of version 7. For unknown reasons, Nero 7 Ultra Edition Enhanced for North America has no LabelFlash or DiscT@2 support as Nero 7 Premium for Europe does.
7.2.7.0	28 August 2006	Last version for Windows 95B/98/ME.
7.5.1.1	18 September 2006	Introduced support for LightScribe and writing data on Blu-ray Disc writer drive.
7.5.7.0	16 October 2006	Designed to run on Windows Vista.
7.7.5.1	18 January 2007	Officially certified for Windows Vista. Fixed all prior reported flaws, updated Booktype support, and added further options for high definition discs.
7.8.5.0	20 March 2007	Bugfix release.
7.10.1.1	4 July 2007	Bugfix release.
7.11.10.0b	21 January 2010	Bugfix release.
7.11.10.0c	March 11, 2010	Windows 7 compatibility update. Last release of version 7.
Nero Burning ROM 8
8.1.1.0	1 October 2007	First release of version 8.
8.2.8.0	19 December 2007	Added support for DualLayer DVD-RW media including layer jump junction.
8.3.2.1	12 March 2008	Minor bug fixes. Improved playback compatibility for Blu-ray.
8.3.6.0	14 July 2008	Minor bug fixes. NeroShowTime gained support for DXVA 2.0 and ATI UVD.
8.3.13.0	17 December 2008	
8.3.13.0a	11 January 2010	Prior release of version 8.
8.3.20.0	15 March 2010	Last release of version 8. Last version for Windows 2000.
Nero Burning ROM 9
9.0.9.4b	29 September 2008	First release of version 9. First release to support Windows 7.
9.0.9.4c	16 October 2008	
9.2.6.0	17 December 2008	
9.4.13.2	2 June 2009	
9.4.13.2b	29 June 2009	
9.4.13.2d	28 August 2009	
9.4.26.0	9 October 2009	
9.4.26.0b	24 March 2010	
9.4.44.0b	3 March 2011	Last release of version 9.
Nero Burning ROM 10
10.0.13100	12 April 2010	First retail release of version 10
10.6.11300		Latest update available in official website. Last release of version 10.
Nero Burning ROM 11
11.0.10700		First online release of version 11. First release to support the following BDXL media: BD-R TL, BD-RE TL, BD-R QL, and BD-RE QL.
11.0.12200		
11.0.10500	14 December 2011	
11.2.10300		Last release of version 11.
Nero Burning ROM 12
12.0.00300	24 Sep 2012	First release to officially support under Windows 8.
12.0.00800	03 Dec 2012	
12.5.00900	04 Mar 2013	
12.5.01300	01 Jul 2013	Last release of version 12. Last release not using calendar year for edition naming conventions of Nero Burning ROM.
Nero Burning ROM 2014
15.0.02100	27 Sep 2013	First release of 2014 edition. First release to use calendar year for edition naming conventions of Nero Burning ROM.
15.0.02700	21 Oct 2013	
15.0.03600	27 Nov 2013	
15.0.03900	13 Jan 2014	
15.0.04200	07 Feb 2014	
15.0.04600	11 Mar 2014	
15.0.05300	17 Jun 2014	Last release of 2014 edition.
Nero Burning ROM 2015
16.0.01300	17 Sep 2014	First release of 2015 edition.
16.0.02000	27 Jan 2015	
16.0.02700	06 May 2015	Last release of 2015 edition. Last version for Windows XP and Vista.
Nero Burning ROM 2016
17.0.00?00	21 Sep 2015	First release of 2016 edition.
17.0.00700	03 Mar 2016	
Nero Burning ROM 2017
18.0.00900	04 Oct 2016	First release of 2017 edition.
18.0.16000	06 Dec 2016	
18.0.19000	15 Mar 2017	
Nero Burning ROM 2018
	2017	First release of 2018 edition.
Nero Burning ROM 2024
26.0.1.4	1 Nov 2023	First release of 2024 edition.

Note: Although Nero AG appears to no longer maintain a history of older versions on their website, release notes are archived by several third-party sites.

=== Nero Linux ===
Version number	Release date	Notes
Nero Linux
1.0	12 March 2005	First release
Nero Linux 2
2.1.0.4b	21 February 2007	Last release of Nero Linux version 2
Nero Linux 3
3.0.0.0	24 May 2007	GTK+ 2 port, Unicode support, Blu-ray burning.
3.0.2.1	6 November 2007	
3.1.1.0	13 February 2008	Based on NeroAPI version 7.20. Some command line arguments supported.
3.5	5 April 2008	
3.5.2.3	22 December 2008	
3.5.3.1	18 June 2009	
Nero Linux 4
4.0.0.0	17 September 2009	Current Linux release.
4.0.0.0b	22 December 2010	Latest Linux update

== See also ==
- InCD – drag and drop packet-writing software from Nero AG
- Nero Digital – a suite of MPEG-4 codecs developed by Nero AG
- List of optical disc authoring software
- What's New in Nero Platinum 2024. 15+ Updates, Nero AI Features
