= List of optical disc authoring software =

This is a list of optical disc authoring software.

== Open source ==
=== Multi-platform ===
- cdrtools, a comprehensive command line-based set of tools for creating and burning CDs, DVDs and Blu-rays
- cdrkit, a fork of cdrtools by the Debian project
- cdrdao, open source software for authoring and ripping of CDs in Disk-At-Once mode
- DVDStyler, a GUI-based DVD authoring tool
- libburnia, a collection of command line-based tools and libraries for burning discs

=== Linux and Unix ===
- Brasero, a GNOME disc burning utility
- dvd+rw-tools, a package for DVD and Blu-ray writing on Unix and Unix-like systems
- K3b, the KDE disc authoring program
- Nautilus, the GNOME file manager (includes basic disc burning capabilities)
- Serpentine, the GNOME audio CD burning utility
- Xfburn, the Xfce disc burning program
- X-CD-Roast

=== Windows ===
- InfraRecorder (based on cdrkit and cdrtools)
- DVD Flick (ImgBurn is included)

== Freeware ==
=== Windows ===
- CDBurnerXP
- ImgBurn
- DeepBurner Free
- DVD Decrypter
- DVD Shrink
- AnyBurn
- PowerISO
- gBurner
- Exact Audio Copy (EAC)

=== macOS ===
- Disco

== Commercial proprietary ==
=== macOS ===
- Adobe Encore
- DVD Studio Pro
- Roxio Toast

=== Linux ===
- Nero Linux

=== Windows ===
- Adobe Encore
- Alcohol 120%
- AVS Video Editor
- Blindwrite
- CDRWIN
- CloneCD
- CloneDVD
- DeepBurner
- DiscJuggler
- Roxio Creator
- MagicISO
- Nero Burning ROM
- Netblender
- SEBAS
- TMPGEnc Authoring Works 7
- UltraISO

== See also ==
- Comparison of disc authoring software
