= Comparison of disc image software =

Notable software applications that can access or manipulate disk image files are as follows, comparing their disk image handling features.

Name	Creates (Note: Specifies whether the application can create a new disc image file, either by capturing the image of an actual disc, by composing a disc image file from locally stored files or an empty disc image.)	Modifies? (Note: Specifies whether the application is able to manipulate the contents of an existing disc image file, including adding, changing or deleting files within or modifying disc image metadata.)	Mounts? (Note: Specifies whether the application can emulate an optical disc drive. Such an application treats a disc image file like a virtual disc and virtually inserts it into that emulated virtual drive.)	Writes/Burns? (Note: Specifies whether the application can write the contents of a disk image file onto a physical media (such as an optical disc, a floppy disk, a hard disk drive or a USB flash drive) and create a physical replica.)	Extracts? (Note: Specifies whether the application can copy some or all of the files within a disc image file to somewhere else.)	Input format (Note: Specifies the types of disc image formats that the application can open.)	Output format (Note: Specifies the types of disc image formats that the application can save to.)	OS	License
7-Zip	Yes	No	No	No	Yes	CramFS, DMG, FAT, HFS, MBR, NTFS, ISO, SquashFS, UDF, VHD, WIM	WIM	Windows, Linux, Classic Mac OS	Free software (GPL)
AcetoneISO	Yes	No	Yes	Yes	Yes	CD, DVD, ISO, BIN, MDF+MDS, IMG, NRG, CUE, TOC, DMG	CD, DVD, ISO, BIN	Linux	Free software (GPL)
Acronis True Image	Yes	No	Yes	Yes	Yes	TIB, VHD	TIB, VHD	Windows	Shareware
Alcohol 120%	Yes	No	Yes	Yes	No	ISO, B5T, B6T, BWT, CCD, CDI, BIN+CUE, MDF+MDS, NRG, ISZ	MDF+MDS, ISO	Windows	Trialware
Alcohol 52% FE	Yes	No	Yes	No	No	ISO	—N/a	Windows	Adware
AnyDVD HD	Yes	No	No	No	No	—N/a	ISO	Windows	Shareware
Archive Manager	No	No	No	No	Yes	ISO	—N/a	Unix-like	Free software (GPL)
Ashampoo Burning Studio	Yes	No	No	Yes	No	ISO, BIN+CUE	ISO, BIN+CUE	Windows	Shareware (Note: Past version are made available as freeware from time to time)
BlindWrite	Yes	No	No	Yes	No	B5T, B6T, BWA, BWI, BWS, BWT, BIN+CUE, ISO, MDF+MDS	B5T, B6T, BWA, BWI, BWS, BWT, BIN+CUE, ISO, MDF+MDS	Windows	Shareware
Brasero	No	No	No	Yes	No	ISO, CUE	CD, DVD	Linux	Free software (GPL)
Burnatonce	No	No	No	Yes	No	ISO, CUE, TOC	—N/a	Windows	Freeware
CDBurnerXP	Yes	No	No	Yes	No	ISO, MDF+MDS, NRG, BIN+CUE	ISO, MDF+MDS	Windows	Freeware
CDemu	Yes	No	Yes	Yes	Yes	CSO, ECM, GBI, GZ, XZ, ISZ, DMG, ISO, UDF, NRG, CDI, CCD, SUB, IMG, BIN+CUE, TOC, B5T+B5I, B6T+B6I, MDF+MDS, MDX, CIF, C2D, DAA	ISO, TOC	Linux	Free software (GPL v2)
genisoimage	Yes	No	No	No	No	—N/a	?	Linux, Unix	Free software (GPL)
isoinfo	No	No	No	No	Yes	?	—N/a	Unix, Linux, Amiga; Windows, macOS	Free software (GPL)
mkisofs	Yes	No	No	No	No	—N/a	?	Unix, Linux, Amiga; Windows, macOS	Free software (GPL)
CDRoller	Yes	No	No	Yes	Yes	ISO	ISO	Windows	Shareware
CDRWIN	Yes	Yes	No	Yes	Yes	ISO, BIN+CUE, Audio File Types+CUE, ISO+CUE, Audio File Types+ISO+CUE, ISO+Audio File Types+CUE	BIN+CUE	Windows	Shareware
CloneCD	Yes	No	No	Yes	No	—N/a	ISO, UFD, IMG	Windows	Shareware
CloneDVD	Yes	No	No	Yes	Yes	ISO	ISO	Windows	Shareware
Daemon Tools	Yes	All editions except Lite	Yes	Yes (Note: Lite editions requires Astroburn)	All editions except Lite	BIN+CUE, B5T, B6T, BWT, CCD, CDI, ISO, ISZ, MDF+MDS, MDX, NRG, VHD, VMDK and TrueCrypt (Note: Daemon Tools supports the following non-image formats: ZIP, APE+CUE, FLAC+CUE, WAV+CUE)	ISO, MDF+MDS, MDX – VHD and TrueCrypt in Ultra edition	Windows	Freemium (Note: All editions are trialware, except Lite edition, which is only shareware in Korea but freeware elsewhere.)
DeepBurner	Yes	No	No	Yes	No	ISO	ISO	Windows	Freemium
Disco	Yes	No	No	Yes	No	CDR, ISO, DMG	CDR, ISO, DMG	macOS	Freeware
DiscJuggler	?	?	?	?	?	CDI, ISO	CDI	Windows	Shareware
Disk Utility	Yes	Yes	Yes	Yes	Yes	DMG, ISO	DMG, ISO	macOS	Part of macOS
DiskImageMounter	No	Yes	Yes	Yes	No	DMG, ISO	DMG, ISO	macOS	Part of macOS
DVD Shrink	Yes	No	No	No	Yes (Note: Opens DVD images (File menu or Ctrl-I))	ISO, NRG, IMG, MDF+MDS	ISO	Windows	Freeware
Image for Windows	Yes	No	Yes	Yes	Yes	TBI, VHD, VMDK	TBI, VHD, VMDK	Windows	Shareware
ImgBurn	Yes	No	No	Yes	No	APE+CUE, BIN+CUE, CDI, CDR, DI, FLAC+CUE, GCM, GI, IBQ, IMG, ISO, LST, MDF+MDS, NRG, PDI, UDI, WV	ISO, IMG, BIN+CUE	Windows	Freeware
InfraRecorder	Yes	No	No	Yes	No	ISO	ISO	Windows	Free software (GPL)
ISO Recorder	Yes	No	No	Yes	No	ISO	ISO	Windows	Free software (BSD license)
IsoBuster	Yes	No	No	Yes	Yes	DAO, TAO, ISO, BIN, IMG, CCD, CIF, FCD, NRG, GCD, P01, 2D, CUE, CDI, CD, GI, PXI, MDS, MDF, VC4, 000, B5T, B5I, B6T, B6I, DMG, HFV, DC42, IBP, IBQ, IBDAT, IBADR, NCD, FLP, E01, Ex01, S01, RMG, VMDK, UDF, DD, VHD, VHDX, VDI, WBFS, XISO, XBX, ST, GDI, DCM, VMU, DDF, GME, MCD, MCI, MCR, MEM, PS, PSM, SAVERAM, SRM, VCD, VGS, VM1, VMP, APA, DAT, PS2, VM2, VMC, RAW, DSK, IMAGE, IMA, ADF, HDF, N64, MPG, GCP, CSO, WBI, ZSO, DAX, JSO, IMGC, ISO.GZ, IMG.GZ, ISZ, 1Kn, 2Kn, 4Kn, 8Kn, 16Kn, 32Kn, 64Kn, 512e, 512, 128, 256, 2056, 2324, 2332, 2336, 2352, 2368, 2448, AFF, AFM, AFD	ISO, TAO, BIN, CUE, IBADR+IBDAT, DSK, 1KN, 2KN, 4KN, 8KN, 16KN, 32KN, 64KN, IBR, IBP and IBQ	Windows	Shareware
K3b	Yes	No	No	Yes	Yes	ISO	—N/a	Unix-like	Free software (GPL)
libguestfs	Yes	Yes	Yes	No	Yes	raw, qcow2, VMDK, VHD	raw, qcow2, VMDK, VHD	Linux	Free software (LGPL)
Loop device	No	No	Yes	No	No	Raw image	—N/a	Linux, FreeBSD	Free software
MagicISO	Yes	Yes	With MagicDisc	Yes	Yes	Both MagicISO and MagicDisc: ISO, BIN+CUE, IMA, IMG, CIF, NRG, IMG+CCD, MDF+MDS, VCD, VaporCD, P01, MD1, XA, VC4/000, VDI, C2D, BWI+BWT, CDI, TAO/DAO, PDI. MagicISO only: DMG, FLP, DSK, BFI, BIF, WBT	ISO, BIN+CUE, UIF, NRG, DMG	Windows	Shareware (Note: MagicDisc is Freeware) (discontinued)
mount	No	No	Yes	No	No	ISO	—N/a	Linux	Free software (GPL)
Nero Multimedia Suite	Yes	No	No	Yes	No	ISO, NRG	ISO, NRG	Windows	Shareware
Nero Burning ROM	Yes	No	No	Yes	No	ISO, NRG	ISO, NRG	Windows	Shareware
Nero Linux	Yes	No	No	Yes	No	ISO, NRG	ISO, NRG	Linux	Shareware (Discontinued)
Norton Ghost	Yes	No	Yes	Yes	?	GHO, GHS, VMDK, V2I, IV2I, PQI	GHO, GHS, VMDK	Windows	Shareware
Partimage	Yes	No	No	Yes	No	Compressed file system images: Ext2, Ext3, Reiserfs, FAT16, FAT32, HPFS, JFS, Xfs, UFS, HFS and NTFS	Ext2, Ext3, Reiserfs, FAT16, FAT32, HPFS, JFS, Xfs, UFS, HFS and NTFS	Linux	Free software (GPL)
PeaZip	No	No	No	No	Yes	DMG, ISO, VHD, WIM	—N/a	Windows, Linux	Free software (LGPL v3)
Roxio Creator	Yes	No	No	Yes	No	ISO, C2D, BIN+CUE, GI	ISO, GI	Windows	Proprietary commercial
Roxio Toast	No	No	No	Yes	No	ISO, BIN+CUE, IMG, DMG, CDR, NRG	—N/a	macOS	Proprietary commercial
UltraISO	Yes	Yes	Yes	Yes	Yes	BIN+CUE, BWI+BWT, B5T+B5I, B6T+B6I, C2D, CDI, CIF, DAA, DMG, FCD, G2D, GCD, GI, IMA, IMG+CCD, IML, ISO, ISZ, LCD, MDF+MDS, NCD, NRG, P01+MD1+XA, PDI, PXI, TAO, DAO, UIF, VaporCD, VC4/000, VCD, VDI, XMD+XMF	BIN+CUE, CCD+IMG+SUB, ISO, ISZ, MDF+MDS, NRG	Windows	Trialware
Virtual CloneDrive	No	No	Yes	No	No	ISO, BIN, IMG, UDF, DVD, CCD	—N/a	Windows	Freeware (discontinued)
Virtual CD-ROM Control Panel	No	No	Yes	No	No	ISO	—N/a	Windows	Freeware
WADK	Yes	Yes	Yes	Yes	No	WIM, WSM	WIM, WSM	Windows NT	Freeware; DISM component is included with Windows
WinCDEmu	Yes	No	Yes	No	No	ISO, BIN, NRG, MDF+MDS, CCD, IMG	—N/a	Windows	Free software (LGPL)
File Explorer	VHD only	No	Yes	ISO only	No	ISO, VHD	VHD	Windows NT	Part of Windows
WinRAR	No	No	No	No	Yes	ISO	—N/a	Windows	Shareware
WinZip	No	No	No	No	Yes	ISO	—N/a	Windows	Shareware
xorriso	Yes	Yes	Linux; FreeBSD	Linux, BSD, Solaris	Yes	ISO	ISO	Unix, Linux, Cygwin, macOS	Free software (GPL)
Name	Creates?	Modifies?	Mounts?	Writes/Burns?	Extracts?	Input format	Output format	OS	License

== See also ==
- Disk image
- Disk partitioning
- Optical disc authoring
- List of optical disc authoring software
- Comparison of disc authoring software
- Comparison of disk cloning software
