= Comparison of optical disc authoring software =

This comparison of disc authoring software compares different optical disc authoring software.

== Application ==
=== General information ===
Basic general information about the application.

Application	Creator	Software license
Ashampoo Burning Studio	Ashampoo Software	Freemium
Alcohol 120%	Alcohol Soft	Shareware
CDBurnerXP	Stefan Haglund, Fredrik Haglund	Freeware
cdrtools	Jörg Schilling	Open-source (CDDL parts are GPL)
DeepBurner	Astonsoft	Freemium
ImgBurn	LIGHTNING UK!	Freeware
InfraRecorder	Christian Kindahl	Open-source (GPL)
K3b	Sebastian Trüg, Christian Kvasny	Open-source (GPL)
Libburnia	Libburnia team	Open-source (GPL)
Nero Burning ROM	Ahead Software	Shareware
UltraISO	EZB Systems	Shareware
X-CD-Roast	T. Niederreiter	Open-source (GPL)
Application	Creator	Software license

=== Operating system support ===
The list is not exhaustive, but rather reflects the most common operating systems.

Application	Microsoft Windows	Mac OS X	Linux	BSD	Unix
Alcohol 120%	Yes	No	No	No	No
CDBurnerXP	Yes	No	No	No	No
cdrtools	Yes	Yes	Yes	Yes	Yes
DeepBurner	Yes	No	No	No	No
ImgBurn	Yes	No	No	No	No
InfraRecorder	Yes	No	No	No	No
K3b	No	No	Yes	Yes	No
Libburnia	No	Yes	Yes	Yes	Solaris
Nero Burning ROM	Yes	No	Yes	No	No
UltraISO	Yes	No	No	No	No
X-CD-Roast	No	Yes	Yes	Yes	Yes
Application	Microsoft Windows	Mac OS X	Linux	BSD	Unix

=== Optical media support ===
Which single-sided optical media types the application supports. The list is not exhaustive, but rather reflects the most common types in use (i.e. not the now defunct HD DVD-R & UDO)

Application	CD-R/W	DVD-R/RW/RAM	DVD+R/RW	DVD+R/RW DL	DVD-R/RW DL	BD-R/RE	BD-R/RE DL
Alcohol 120%	Yes	Yes	Yes	Yes	Yes	No	No
CDBurnerXP	Yes	Yes	Yes	Yes	Yes	Yes	Yes
cdrtools	Yes	Yes	Yes	Yes	Yes	Yes	Yes
DeepBurner	Yes	Yes	Yes	?	?	No	No
ImgBurn	Yes	Yes	Yes	Yes	Yes	Yes	Yes
InfraRecorder	Yes	Yes	Yes	Yes	Yes	No	No
K3b	Yes	Yes	Yes	Yes	Yes	Yes	Yes
Libburnia	Yes	Yes	Yes	Yes	Yes	Yes	Yes
Nero Burning ROM	Yes	Yes	Yes	Yes	Yes	Yes	Yes
UltraISO	Yes	Yes	Yes	Yes	Yes	Yes	Yes
X-CD-Roast	Yes	Yes	Yes	?	?	No	No
Application	CD-R/W 737MB=702MiB	DVD-R/RW/RAM 4.707GB=4.384GiB	DVD+R/RW 4.700GB=4.378GiB	DVD+R/RW DL 8.548GB=7.961GiB	DVD-R/RW DL 8.544GB=7.957GiB	BD-R/RE 25GB=23.31GiB	BD-R/RE DL 50GB=46.61GiB

=== Filesystem support ===
Which filesystems the application supports.

Application	ISO 9660	Joliet	Rock Ridge	Amiga rock ridge	El Torito	Apple ISO9660	UDF	MRW
Alcohol 120%	Yes	Yes	No	No	No	No	No	No
CDBurnerXP	Yes	Yes	No	No	No	No	Yes	No
cdrtools	Yes	Yes	Yes	No	Yes	Yes	Yes	No
ImgBurn	Yes	Yes	No	No	Yes	No	Yes	No
InfraRecorder	Yes	Yes	?	?	?	?	Yes	?
K3b	Yes	Yes	Yes	?	Yes	No	Yes	No
Libburnia	Yes	Yes	Yes	No	Yes	No	No	No
Nero Burning ROM	Yes	Yes	No	No	Yes	Yes	Yes	Yes
UltraISO	Yes	Yes	?	?	?	?	Yes	?
X-CD-Roast	Yes	Yes	Yes	No	Yes	No	Yes	No
Application	ISO 9660	Joliet	Rock Ridge	Amiga rockridge	El Torito	Apple ISO9660	UDF	MRW

=== Disk image format support ===
Information which Disk image formats an application supports.

Application	bin/cue	Apple disk image	img	ISO image	Nero CD image	Audio file/cue
Alcohol 120%	Yes	No	No	Yes	Yes	No
CDBurnerXP	Partial	No	No	Yes	Partial	Yes
cdrtools	Yes	?	?	Yes	No	Yes
DeepBurner	?	?	?	Yes	?	?
ImgBurn	Yes	No	Yes	Yes	Yes	Yes
InfraRecorder	Yes	No	Yes	Yes	No	?
K3b	Yes	?	?	Yes	Yes	Yes
Libburnia	Yes	No	Yes	Yes	No	Yes
Nero Burning ROM	Yes	No	Partial	Yes	Yes	Yes
UltraISO	Yes	Yes	Yes	Yes	Yes	Yes
X-CD-Roast	?	?	?	Yes	?	?
Application	bin/cue	Apple disk image	img	ISO image	Nero CD image	Audio file/cue

=== Standards support ===
Support for Rainbow book standards:

- Red book: CD-DA
- Yellow book: CD-ROM
- Orange book: CD-R and CD-RW
- White book: VCD and SVCD
- Blue book: E-CD
- Beige book: PCD
- Green book: CD-i discs
- Purple book: DDCD
- Scarlet book: SACD

Application	Red (CD-DA)	Yellow (CD-ROM)	Orange (CD-R/CD-RW)	White (VCD/SVCD)	Blue (E-CD)	Beige (PCD)	Green (CD-I)	Purple (DDCD)	Scarlet (SACD)
Alcohol 120%	No	Yes	Yes	No	No	No	No	No	No
CDBurnerXP	Yes	Yes	Yes	No	No	No	No	No	No
cdrtools	Yes	Yes	Yes	Yes	Yes	Yes	?	?	?
DeepBurner	Yes	Yes	Yes	Yes	Yes	Yes	Yes	Yes	Yes
ImgBurn	Yes	Yes	Yes	No	?	?	Yes	No	?
InfraRecorder	?	?	Yes	?	?	?	?	?	?
K3b	Yes	?	Yes	Yes	Yes	No	Yes	No	?
Libburnia	Yes	Yes	Yes	No	No	No	No	No	No
Nero Burning ROM	Yes	Yes	Yes	Yes	No	No	No	No	No
UltraISO	Yes	Yes	Yes	?	?	?	?	?	?
X-CD-Roast	Yes	Yes	Yes	No	No	No	No	No	No
Application	Red (CD-DA)	Yellow (CD-ROM)	Orange (CD-R/CD-RW)	White (VCD/SVCD)	Blue (E-CD)	Beige (PCD)	Green (CD-I)	Purple (DDCD)	Scarlet (SACD)

=== User interface ===
Information which User interfaces an application supports.

Application	Command line interface	Graphical user interface	Text user interface
Alcohol 120%	No	Yes	No
CDBurnerXP	Yes	Yes	No
cdrtools	Yes	No	No
DeepBurner	No	Yes	No
ImgBurn	No	Yes	No
InfraRecorder	No	Yes	No
K3b	Yes	Yes	No
Libburnia	Yes	No	No
Nero Burning ROM	No	Yes	No
UltraISO	Yes	Yes	No
X-CD-Roast	No	Yes	No
Application	Command line interface	Graphical user interface	Text user interface

== See also ==
- Optical disc authoring software
- List of optical disc authoring software
- Comparison of disc image software
