= K9Copy =

DVD backup and authoring software

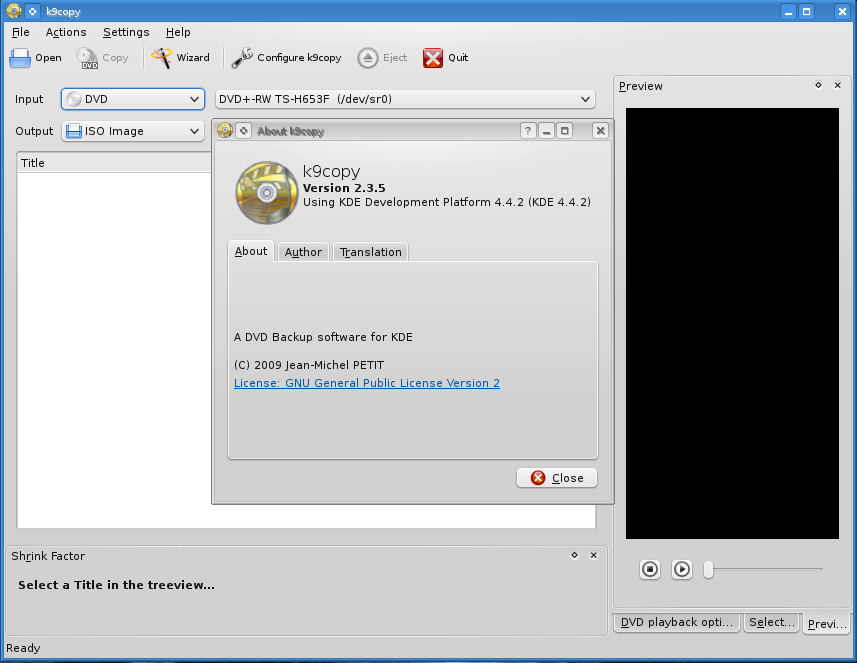
- Developer: Jean-Michel Petit
- Initial release: 18 January 2006; 19 years ago
- Stable release: 3.0.3 (16 October 2014; 11 years ago) [±]
- Repository: sourceforge.net/projects/k9copy/
- Operating system: Unix-like
- Type: DVD backup / DVD authoring
- License: GPL-2.0-or-later
- Website: k9copy.sourceforge.net

K9Copy is a free and open-source DVD backup and DVD authoring program for Unix-like operating systems such as Linux and BSD. It is licensed under the GNU General Public License.

== Features ==
K9Copy facilitates several methods for backing up a DVD and uses libdvdcss to circumvent CSS copy protection if installed.

The software enables direct backup of a single layer DVD-5 provided the user's computer has a DVD recorder. Likewise, direct backup of a dual layer DVD-9 is possible with a dual layer DVD recorder.

K9Copy is able to fit the contents of a dual layer DVD-9 onto a single layer DVD-5. The interface allows a user to explicitly retain or discard any content from the original disc such as video titles, audio tracks, subtitles and the DVD menu. All content selected for backup is compressed to a configurable target size (4400 MB by default) and stored on the user's hard drive as either an ISO image file or a DVD VIDEO TS folder. K9Copy can either transfer the backup data to blank DVD±R media itself or utilize external DVD authoring software such as K3b for this task. Furthermore, an ISO image file produced by K9Copy can be recorded to DVD by any software on any platform capable of recording ISO images to disc.

Functionality for backing up a DVD to a video file (such as a MPEG-4-encoded MKV-file) rather than a disc also exists in K9Copy. The interface allows the user to select the preferred encoder (either MEncoder or FFmpeg) and codec for video and audio compression as well as a target file size or bit rate for the resulting file.

K9Copy includes basic DVD authoring capabilities.

== Development ==
Development was resumed in 2014, under the project listing of K9copy-reloaded at SourceForge.net, by a new developer after the initial development of K9Copy was stopped in 2011 with the author citing the fragmentation of Linux as a major issue.

== See also ==
- DVD Decrypter, a freeware tool that allows you to decrypt and copy DVDs to your PC's hard disk
- DVD Shrink, a freeware DVD transcoder program for Microsoft Windows that uses a DVD ripper to back up DVD video.
- HandBrake, open-source DVD to MPEG-4 converter, available for BeOS, Mac OS X, Linux and Windows, released under the terms of the GNU General Public License
