= Burnatonce =

Optical disc authoring software

Burnatonce is an optical disc authoring (CD/DVD) freeware software for Microsoft Windows created by Jamie Osborne.

It is a frontend to various other software components such as: cdrdao, ddump, MPEG Audio Decoder, and WaveGain. It can author ISO image, CUE and TOC files. CD-Text can be written from the built-in editor, imported from freedb, read from media tags, or extracted from filenames. ReplayGain can be applied to WAV audio files (using WaveGain).

The latest available version is 0.99.5 (April 17, 2004) and the original web site www.burnatonce.com is no longer available. The software can still be found on some download sites.

== See also ==
- Comparison of ISO image software
