= Direct Access Archive =

- Filename extension: .daa
- Developed by: PowerISO Computing, Inc.
- Type of format: Disk image

Direct Access Archive, or DAA, is a proprietary file format developed by PowerISO Computing, Inc for disk image files. The format supports features such as compression, password protection, and splitting to multiple volumes. Popular Windows disk image mounting programs such as Alcohol 120% and Daemon Tools currently do not support the mounting of DAA images; Linux and BSD also do not support mounting images of this kind.

Currently there is no published information about the format. Among mainstream applications, it can be opened or converted with MagicISO and UltraISO. Various free and open-source packages are also available to convert DAA to ISO images.

== File Structure ==
Although lacking official documentation, DAA image files are zlib- or lzma-compressed ISO images chunk by chunk.

== Conversion ==
PowerISO provides free command-line tools for Linux and Mac OS X which allow the user to extract DAA files or convert them into ISO format, however these tools have not been updated to support the newest version of the DAA format. The PowerISO Windows trial version only supports converting images from DAA files up to 300MB, less than half of the capacity of a standard CD.

AcetoneISO is a free CD/DVD management application for Linux that can convert DAA to ISO with the help of the external PowerISO command-line tool for Linux.

daa2iso is an open source command line application has been developed to convert DAA files to ISO files. The program comes with a Windows binary and source code which compiles under Unix-like operating systems. daa2iso allows users to select the .daa file, and the location for the .iso output via standard windows open and save dialogs

For Mac OS X, DAA Converter is a GUI application which wraps the daa2iso command-line tool (GNU license).

== Features ==
Due to using freely available compression algorithms, DAA includes the following features that are absent in ISO (but can be obtained by manually compressing ISO files):

- Ability to compress images, thus saving space and allowing smaller downloads
- Can be password protected
- Can be split into multiple smaller files
