= CDRoller =

Utility for CD and DVD data recovery

- Developer: Digital Atlantic Corp.
- Initial release: 10 December 1999; 26 years ago
- Stable release: 12.4 / 12 January 2026; 2 months ago
- Operating system: Windows 2000, Windows XP, Windows Vista, Windows 7
- Size: 8.0 MB
- Available in: English, German, French, Spanish
- Type: Data recovery software, optical disc authoring software
- License: Trialware
- Website: www.cdroller.com

CDRoller is a utility for CD and DVD data recovery. It supports a wide set of CD and DVD formats, including HD DVD and Blu-ray. CDRoller has the ability to read CD and DVD with UDF File System written by Roxio and Ahead Nero software. It allows users to find the VOB files on mini DVD when recorded video cannot be played due to a failure of camcorder, or disc finalization was accidentally interrupted. The built-in "Split Video" converts the recovered VOB data into generic MPEG-2 files that can be played back in Windows Media Player. CDRoller can also extract the pictures (JPEG files) from 8 cm CD-R/CD-RW, created by Sony Mavica CD digital cameras.

== File retrieval ==
The program also finds and retrieves lost pictures, video and other types of files from flash memory cards, such as SmartMedia, Memory Stick, CompactFlash and other flash memory drives.

== DVD authoring ==
A built-in DVD authoring option allows user to make a new disc in the DVD-Video format. A new CD or DVD can be also compiled from recovered files and folders or an ISO image.

== See also ==
- List of data recovery software
- List of ISO image software
