= AcetoneISO =

Open source virtual drive software

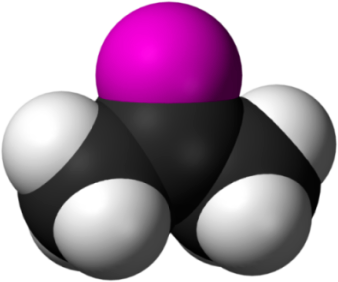

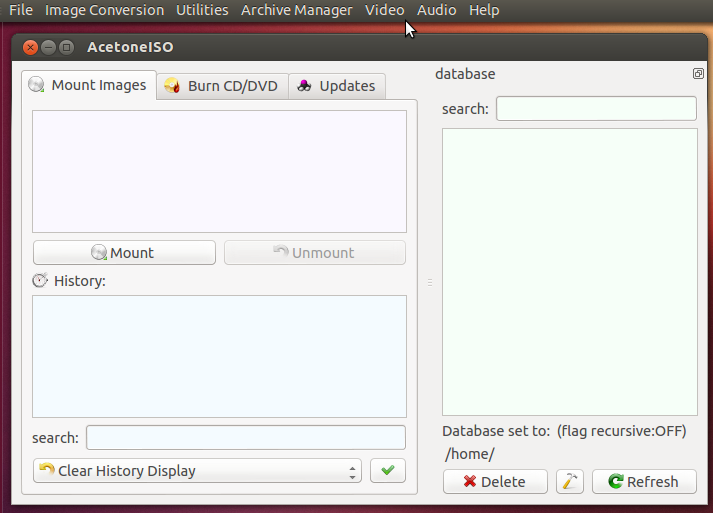
- AcetoneISO on Ubuntu
- Original authors: Fabrizio Di Marco, Marco Di Antonio
- Developer: Marco Di Antonio
- Stable release: 2.4-3 / April 18, 2019; 6 years ago
- Written in: C++ with Qt5
- Operating system: Linux
- Available in: English, Italian, Polish, Spanish, Romanian, Hungarian, German, Czech, Russian
- Type: Virtual drive
- License: GNU GPL (free software)
- Website: launchpad.net/acetoneiso

AcetoneISO is a free and open-source virtual drive software to mount and manage image files. Its goals are to be simple, intuitive and stable. Written in Qt, this software is meant for all those people looking for a "Daemon Tools for Linux". However, AcetoneISO does not emulate any copy protection while mounting.

AcetoneISO also supports Direct Access Archive (*.daa) images because it uses the non-free and proprietary PowerISO Linux software as a backend while converting images to ISO.

Around the year 2010, AcetoneISO gained native support for burning ISO/CUE/TOC images to CD-R/RW and DVD-+R/RW (including DL) media thanks to external open source tools such as cdrkit, cdrdao and growisofs.

It is available in Arch Linux (in AUR), Debian, Ubuntu, Slackware, and Fedora Linux.

== Features ==
- Mount automatically ISO, BIN, MDF, and NRG without the need to insert admin password. Only single-track images are supported for the moment.
- Burn ISO/TOC/CUE to CD-R/RW optical discs
- Burn ISO images to DVD-+R/RW (including DL)
- A native utility to blank CD-RW, DVD-RW, and DVD-RW discs
- A nice display which shows current images mounted and possibility to click on it to quickly re-open mounted image
- Convert 2 ISO image types: bin mdf nrg img daa dmg cdi b5i bwi pdi
- Extract images content to a folder: bin mdf nrg img daa dmg cdi b5i bwi pdi
- Play a DVD Movie Image with Kaffeine / VLC / SMplayer with auto-cover download from Amazon
- Generate an ISO from a Folder or CD/DVD
- Check MD5 file of an image and/or generate it to a text file
- Calculate ShaSums of images in 128, 256, and 384 bit
- Encrypt / Decrypt an image
- Split / Merge image in X megabyte
- Compress with high ratio an image in 7z format
- Rip a PSX CD to *.bin to make it work with ePSXe/pSX emulators
- Restore a lost CUE file of *.bin *.img
- Convert Mac OS *.dmg to a mountable image
- Mount an image in a specified folder from the user
- Create a database of images to manage big collections
- Extract the Boot Image file of a CD/DVD or ISO
- Backup a CD-Audio to a *.bin image
- Complete localization for English, Italian, French, Spanish and Polish
- Quick and simple utility to rip a DVD to Xvid AVI
- Quick and simple utility to convert a generic video (avi, mpeg, mov, wmv, asf) to Xvid AVI
- Quick and simple utility to convert a FLV video to AVI
- Utility to download videos from YouTube and Metacafe.
- Extract audio from a video file
- Extract a *.rar archive that has a password
- Utility to convert any video for Sony PSP PlayStation Portable
- Display History that shows all images you mount in time

== Limitations ==
- Does not emulate copy protection mount like Daemon Tools.
- Can't mount correctly a multi-session image. Only the first track will be shown.
- Converting a multi-session image to ISO will result in a loss of data. Only first track will be converted.
- Image conversion to ISO is only possible on x86 and x86-64 CPU architecture due to PowerISO limitations.

== Localization ==
- AcetoneISO is currently translated to: English, Italian, Polish, Spanish, Romanian, Hungarian, German, Czech, and Russian.

== See also ==
- CDemu
- List of ISO image software
