= DVD Shrink =

Optical disc authoring software

- Developer: DVD Shrink
- Final release: 3.2.0.15 / July 25, 2004; 22 years ago
- Operating system: Microsoft Windows
- Type: Optical disc authoring
- License: Freeware
- Website: www.dvdshrink.org

DVD Shrink is a freeware DVD transcoder program for Microsoft Windows that uses a DVD ripper to back up DVD video. It can also be run under Linux using Wine. The final versions are 3.2.0.15 (English) and 3.2.0.16 (German); all other versions, such as DVD Shrink 2010, are illegitimate. DVD Shrink's purpose is, as its name implies, to reduce the amount of data stored on a DVD with minimal loss of quality, although some loss of quality is inevitable (due to the lossy MPEG-2 compression algorithm). It creates a copy of a DVD, during which the DVD region code is removed, and copy protection may also be circumvented. A stamped DVD may require more space than is available on a writeable DVD, unless shrunk. Many commercially released video DVDs are dual layer (8.5 GB); DVD Shrink can make a shrunk copy which will fit on a single-layer (4.7 GB) writeable DVD, processing the video with some loss of quality and allowing the user to discard unwanted content such as foreign-language soundtracks.

== Features ==
DVD Shrink is designed to be easy to use. It is contained within a single executable file that is one megabyte in size. The program features a DeCSS decryption algorithm, enabling it to open and decrypt many currently available DVDs, although it is defeated by some newer copy protection techniques. As well as this, it can open DVD files contained in a VIDEO_TS folder or a disk image (ISO, IMG, NRG or MDS/Ixx).

The DVD video may then be re-encoded by the application's VBR encoder. The user is able to choose how the compression is to be distributed across the DVD. DVD Shrink can automatically re-compress video, to as little as 39% of its original size, depending on the aspect ratio of the original DVD (with a corresponding loss in quality) to allow it to fit on a standard DVD±R(W), a Dual-Layer DVD+R, or any user-defined custom size. When "Deep Analysis" and "Adaptive Error Compensation" options are selected, the quality of the resulting DVD is improved. These options are more time-consuming because DVD Shrink runs through the DVD once doing the analysis, and then again doing the transcoding. The transcoder in DVD Shrink was unusual at the time of its release in that it employs compressed domain video processing technology to avoid a full decode and re-encode of the video stream. This boosts performance significantly as only part of the video stream is decoded and scraped.

DVD Shrink operates in two main modes, "Reauthor" and "Full Disk".

In "Reauthor" mode, the interface allows the user to choose specifically which DVD elements (Main Title, Menus, audio tracks and subtitles, and Special Features) to retain on the "shrunken" DVD; the Menu clips are stored in folders and some of them are playable. The compression is automatic if the Main Title only is selected, to fit it onto the selected size of DVD. If Special Features are also selected, their compression may be manually selected at the minimum possible using the Custom Ratio option, to give disk space to the Main Title.

In "Full Disk" mode, DVD Shrink allows the user to make a functionally identical backup copy without changes; alternatively random audio/subtitle streams can be deselected. Sections of the DVD, such as unwanted messages or logos/titles, can be replaced with still images, saving disk space for the Main Title. The compression can be automatic or manual, which allows selection of greatest compression for Menus or Special Features, saving disc space for the Main Title.

In either mode, the program has options to facilitate the stripping of the CSS copy protection, User operation prohibition (prohibiting skipping over previews or "FBI Warnings" and so on), and also allows the copy to be either made region-free (the default setting) or set for any region code. Extra software (such as AnyDVD, AVS Video Converter, or DVD Decrypter) may be required to remove more recent forms of copy protection such as Macrovision Ripguard. DVD Shrink can also shrink hard disk files already ripped by programs that can overcome more recent copy protection systems, but that do not offer the 2-layer to 1-layer compression.

Once the DVD content has been reduced in data size, the resulting output is an ISO file or a DVD VIDEO_TS folder. The program cannot burn these images itself, as it does not contain a built-in burning engine. It can however automatically pass the burning job to either Nero (version 7 or lower), DVD Decrypter or CopyToDVD as long as these programs are installed. This process appears transparent to the end user. To burn with ImgBurn the user can either copy the ImgBurn executable to the DVD Decrypter folder and rename it to dvddecrypter.exe (both engines use the same commands as they are coded by the same programmer) or use the hacked DVD Shrink with ImgBurn version. Alternatively, the resulting ISO file may be burned with any software capable of writing ISO files.

Although DVD Shrink gives the user free rein over compression settings for individual tracks on the DVD, removing content altogether is not allowed as there is a risk of upsetting the DVD's menu software. Audio tracks and subtitles can, however, be removed. DVD Shrink also gives the alternative option of transferring selected sections as a series of stills, which acts as a high-compression "placeholder" for the original.

Recent events (increase in processor speed, lower cost terabyte disk storage, RAID drive functionality, etc.) have made it easier to store the ISO files directly to hard drive, in effect creating large-scale DVD media servers. Playback of these ISO files can be done directly on a network connected computer running a virtual DVD ROM emulator (like Daemon Tools Lite), or even through open source media systems (like XBMC).

DVD Shrink also has other uses. In particular, the 8-cm discs produced by the new DVD-based video camcorders are not fully compatible with all computers and DVD players; "ripping" them with DVD Shrink (or a similar program) and re-recording them to standard-sized DVDs is a quick and very effective solution to this problem. It also allows the recorded footage to be used with drives that do not support 8-cm discs, such as slot-loading drives (often used in Apple Macintosh computers).

Due to new copy protections that have come along since the final edition of DVD Shrink, backups may need the help of one or more other programs such as DVD Decrypter, DVDFab, DVD43 or AnyDVD.

== Legal status ==
On August 17, 2005 the official DVD Shrink website was updated to say that the site "is no more!", prompting many sites to mirror the latest DVD Shrink version and offer it for download. This was a result of DVD Shrink's web host receiving a Digital Millennium Copyright Act (DMCA) takedown notice, as compromising limits on the accessibility of a copyrighted work is prohibited in many cases under the laws of the United States, specifically the Digital Millennium Copyright Act. Shortly after, the website was restored, and a search box was put in place of the download link. DVD Shrink is now available from the official web page again, as it is available from many other sites on the Internet as well, and it suggests finding a download source using a general web search, "DVD Shrink".

In some countries, the software in itself is illegal under applicable laws pertaining to copyrighted content. German law, for instance, while allowing the manufacture of copies of copyrighted digital material for personal, non-commercial use, dictates that it is illegal to circumvent mechanisms that prevent copying. Therefore, the use of any software enabling a user to work around copyright restrictions such as CSS is against the law in Germany.

== Scams ==
The final versions are 3.2.0.15 (English) and 3.2.0.16 (German); all other versions are scams. The "official website" (dvdshrink.org) is not operated by the original developers. Alternate sites like Softpedia have been providing a clean, adware-free download of DVDShrink for a decade but is no longer available there, as well. A list of checksums for other valid DVD Shrink versions is available at the DVD Shrink Forum as well as at the doom9 forum.

== See also ==
- K9Copy
- List of DVD authoring applications
- DVD Decrypter
