= Disco (software) =

- Developer(s): Austin Sarner, Jasper Hauser and Jason Harris
- Stable release: 1.0.3 / February 28, 2008; 17 years ago
- Operating system: Mac OS X
- Type: Optical disc authoring software
- License: Freeware
- Website: www.discoapp.com

Disco is a discontinued application for Mac OS X developed by Austin Sarner, Jasper Hauser and Jason Harris.

The software is an optical disc authoring utility, which allows users to burn CDs and DVDs with multisession support, disc duplication, burning VIDEO_TS folders, disc spanning as well as a searchable disc index, dubbed Discography. Disco also features an interactive "3D smoke" animation which is visible when burning. This smoke responds to microphone input, as well as mouse input, causing perturbations in the smoke effect.

Disco was designed as a low-cost alternative to the popular Mac OS X optical disc authoring application, Roxio Toast.

Since its launch in 2007, Disco was available as shareware, requiring users to purchase a license after burning seven discs with it on a single computer. In July 2011 development was discontinued and a free license code to activate the application was published on its official website, effectively making the application available as freeware.
