= Microsoft PowerToys =

Set of freeware system utilities for Windows

- Original author: Clint Rutkas
- Developer: Microsoft
- Release: November 17, 1996; 30 years ago
- Stable release: 0.102.3101 / November 6, 2026; 13 days ago
- Preview release: 0.103.3062 / November 4, 2026; 15 days ago
- Written in: C++; C#
- Operating system: Windows 10, 11; Discontinued: Windows 95, XP
- Platform: x86-64; AArch64
- Type: System utilities
- License: Proprietary (Windows 95/XP), MIT License (Windows 10 and later)
- Website: docs.microsoft.com/en-us/windows/powertoys/
- Repository: github.com/microsoft/PowerToys

Microsoft PowerToys is an open source set of system utilities for power users for use on Windows. These programs add or change features to maximize productivity or add more customization. PowerToys are available for Windows 95, Windows XP, Windows 10, and Windows 11 (and are explicitly not compatible with Windows Vista, 7, 8, or 8.1). The PowerToys for Windows 10 and Windows 11 are free and open-source software licensed under the MIT License and hosted on GitHub.

== PowerToys for Windows 95 ==
PowerToys for Windows 95 was the first version of Microsoft PowerToys and included 15 tools for power users. It included Tweak UI, a system utility for tweaking the more obscure settings in Windows. In most cases, Tweak UI exposed settings that were otherwise only accessible by directly modifying Windows Registry.

=== Included components ===
The following PowerToys for Windows 95 were available:

- CabView opened cabinet files like ordinary folders;
- CDAutoPlay made AutoPlay work on any non-audio CD;
- Command Prompt Here allowed the user to start a command prompt from any folder in Windows Explorer by right-clicking (native in Windows Vista onwards);
- Contents Menu allowed users to access folders and files from a context menu without having to open their folders;
- Desktop Menu allowed users to open items on the desktop from a menu on the Taskbar;
- Explore From Here enabled users to open Windows Explorer view from any folder such so that the folder acts as the root level folder;
- FindX added drag-and-drop capabilities to Find (later called Search) menu;
- FlexiCD allowed users to play an audio CD from the Taskbar;
- Quick Res allowed users to quickly change the screen resolution;
- Round Clock added an analog round clock without a square window;
- Send To X consisted of Shell extensions which added several commonly accessed locations such as clipboard, desktop, command-line or any folder to the Send To context menu in Explorer;
- Shortcut Target Menu allowed users to access the target file a shortcut is pointing to from the context menu or directly cut, copy, delete the target, create shortcut to the target or view its properties;
- Telephony Location Selector allowed mobile computer users to change their dialling location from the Taskbar;
- TweakUI allowed the user to customize the more obscure settings of the operating system's UI;
- Xmouse 1.2 made the window focus follow the mouse without requiring to click the window to make it active.

PowerToys for Windows 95 were developed by the Windows Shell Development Team. Some of the tools work on later versions of Windows up to Windows XP, but others may interfere with newer built-in features on Windows 98, ME, and XP.

=== Windows 95 Kernel Toys ===
After the success of the Windows 95 PowerToys, the Windows Kernel Development Team released another set of tools for power users called Windows 95 Kernel Toys.

Six tools were included in this package:

- MS-DOS Mode Configuration Wizard Customization Tool allowed users to configure Windows startup files without having to manually edit CONFIG.SYS or AUTOEXEC.BAT;
- Keyboard Remap reassigned functions to keys on the keyboard;
- Logo Key Control configured MS-DOS games so that Windows would ignore the Windows logo key while games were running;
- Conventional Memory Tracker to track and break down the amount of memory being allocated by virtual device drivers;
- Windows Process Watcher (WinTop) monitored how much of CPU resources were taken by individual programs;
- Time Zone Editor enabled the user to create and edit time zone entries for the Date/Time Control Panel applet.

According to Raymond Chen, he wrote all of the Kernel Toys except for the Time Zone Editor, which came from the Windows NT Resource Kit.

== PowerToys for Windows XP ==
PowerToys for Windows XP was the second version of the PowerToys set and brought major changes from the Windows 95 version. The tools in this set were available as separate downloads rather than in a single package.

=== Included components ===
As of November 2009, the following PowerToys for Windows XP were available:

- Alt-Tab Replacement Task Switcher replaced the simpler Alt-Tab switcher with a more visual one which shows live window previews.
- CD Slide Show Generator generates a slideshow from photos burned to a CD.
- ClearType Tuner allowed customizing ClearType settings to make it easier to read text on the screen.
- Color Control Panel Applet allowed managing color profiles, changing color profile associations for devices, viewing detailed properties for color profiles (including a 3D rendering of the color space gamut).
- HTML Slide Show Wizard generates an HTML slideshow presentation.
- Image Resizer allowed right-clicking on multiple image files inside Windows Explorer to batch resize them.
- Open Command Window Here allowed starting a command prompt from any folder in Windows Explorer by right-clicking.
- PowerToys Power Calculator
  Power Calculator was a more advanced graphical calculator application than the built-in Windows Calculator; it could evaluate more complex expressions, draw a Cartesian or polar graph of a function or convert units of measurements. Power Calculator could store and reuse pre-defined functions, of any arity. For example, a function could be set by cube(x) = x * x * x, and later it could be used in an expression like 5 + cube(4). It did not evaluate every time an operator was entered. Rather, the entire expression must be entered for calculation. In the Numeric mode, it presented a visual keypad, in all other modes the expression had to be typed in. A scrolling text area maintained a history of all calculations. The advanced view allowed declaring and graphing functions, along with a list of all the saved functions. A flyout window provided the option of choosing either a Cartesian co-ordinate system or polar co-ordinates. It could also save a list of variables for use in expression. Unit conversions of the following types were supported: length, mass, time, velocity, and temperature. PowerToy Calc had support for typing calculations using Reverse Polish Notation (RPN). It could calculate up to 500 precision levels beyond the decimal point and supported complex numbers.
- RAW Image Thumbnailer and Viewer provided thumbnails, previews, printing, and metadata display for RAW images from within Windows Explorer.
- SyncToy allowed synchronizing files and folders.
- Taskbar Magnifier magnified part of the screen from the taskbar.
- Tweak UI customized Windows XP's user interface and advanced settings.
- Virtual Desktop Manager allowed switching between four virtual desktops from the taskbar.
- Webcam Timershot took pictures at specified time intervals from a webcam.

=== Discontinued components ===
The following PowerToys for Windows XP were discontinued:

- Background Switcher added a slideshow tab to Display properties and allows automatically changing the desktop wallpaper periodically. Although, Background Switcher is retired, a replacement, Wallpaper Changer, is available from Microsoft.
- Internet Explorer Find Bar added a toolbar to Internet Explorer that allowed users to search for keywords in a web page. This feature is natively supported by Internet Explorer 8.
- ISO Image Burner burned ISO images to an Optical disc recorder. This feature is integrated into Windows 7. In addition, Windows Server 2003 Resource Kit includes two similar tools (CDBurn.exe and DVDBurn.exe). Although Microsoft has retired this Power Toy, it is available as the unauthorized ISO Recorder Power Toy.
- Shell Audio Player was a Windows Media Player-based compact player which allows playing music from the taskbar.
- Super-Fast User Switcher allowed Fast User Switching or logging on to a different account using the Windows key+Q combination without requiring to switch to the logon screen.
- Virtual CD-ROM Control Panel could mount an ISO image as a virtual drive. It was designed for Windows XP, but it also worked with Windows Server 2003. It was a free alternative to software such as Alcohol 120%.

== PowerToys for Windows 10 and Windows 11 ==
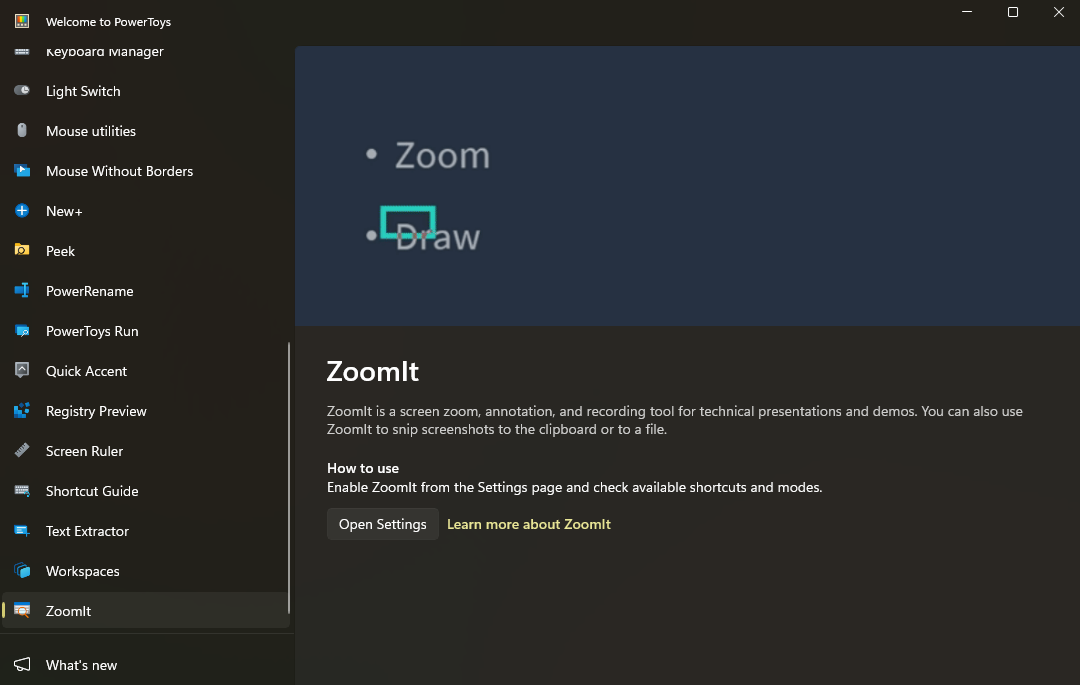
PowerToys on Windows 11

Windows 10 received PowerToys four years after its release. On May 8, 2019, Microsoft relaunched PowerToys and made them open-source on GitHub. The first preview release was available in September 2019, which included FancyZones and the Windows key shortcut guide.

=== Included components ===
PowerToys for Windows 10 comes with the following utilities:

- Always On Top adds the ability to quickly pin windows on top of all other windows with a quick keyboard shortcut.
- PowerToys Awake adds an ability to keep a computer awake without managing its power and sleep settings.
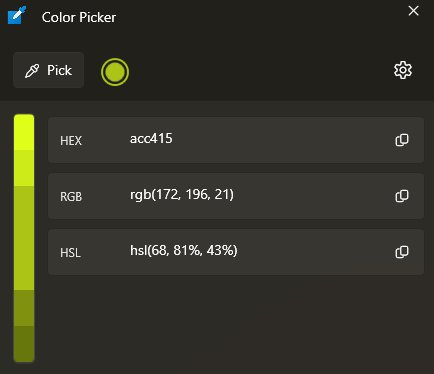
- PowerToys Color Picker on Windows 11
  Color Picker adds a tool for color identification (in HEX, RGB, CMYK, HSL and HSV, among others).
- FancyZones adds a window manager that makes it easier for users to create and use complex window layouts.
- File Explorer (Preview Panes) adds SVG, Markdown and PDF previews to File Explorer.
- File Locksmith adds the ability to check which files are in use and by which processes.
- Host File Editor adds the ability to edit the 'hosts' file in a convenient way.
- Image Resizer adds a context menu to File Explorer for resizing images.
- Keyboard Manager adds options for remapping keys and shortcuts.
- Mouse utilities adds tools that enhance mouse and cursor functionality on Windows. Currently, the collection consists of Find My Mouse, which focuses on the cursor's position; Mouse Highlighter, which indicates mouse clicks on the screen; CursorHide, which allows the cursor to become invisible after a configurable period of inactivity; and Mouse pointer Crosshairs, which displays crosshairs centered on the mouse pointer
- Mouse Without Borders adds a tool which allows a user to move their cursor across multiple devices.
- Paste as Plain Text adds a customizable keyboard shortcut to paste text stripped of text formatting.
- PowerRename adds an option for users to rename files using search and replace or regular expression in File Explorer.
- PowerToys Run adds a Spotlight-like tool that allows users to search for folders, files, applications, and other items.
- Quick Accent adds the ability to type accented characters in an alternative way.
- Registry Preview adds a tool to preview, compare and edit registry file contents before writing to the Windows Registry.
- Screen Ruler adds the ability to measure pixel distances on-screen with image edge detection.
- Shortcut Guide adds a full screen overlay that allows the user to view the Windows key shortcuts available in the current window.
- Text Extractor adds the ability to copy text from anywhere on the screen.
- Video Conference Mute adds tools to disable/enable the camera and microphone.
- ZoomIt adds tools to annotate, zoom, and record for demos and presentations.

== Compatibility with Windows Vista, 7, and 8 ==
PowerToys did not receive any releases supporting Windows Vista. Making equivalent calls to various Windows APIs were still possible though and enabling third-party applications to be implemented with the same, or a subset, of the original functionality. Additionally, among Windows 7, Windows 8 and Windows 8.1, none received official support. Not accounting for time spent developing Windows Vista, PowerToys was not updated for over 12 years, before being re-released as open source software for Windows 10.

== PowerToys for other Microsoft products ==
Microsoft also released PowerToys for Windows XP Tablet PC Edition and Windows XP Media Center Edition.

A set of PowerToys for Windows Media Player was released as part of the Windows Media Player Bonus Pack (for Windows XP), consisting of five tools to "provide a variety of enhancements to Windows Media Player."

Finally, Microsoft has also released PowerToys for Windows Mobile, Visual Studio and OneNote.

== See also ==
- Resource Kit
