= Netblender =

- Company type: Private
- Industry: Software
- Founder: John Harrington IV
- Headquarters: Alexandria, VA
- Area served: Global
- Products: Do Studio; Netblender Live; BD Touch
- Website: www.netblender.com

Netblender US-based company that produces and develops software for creators of Blu-ray high definition media. Based in Alexandria, Virginia, and founded in 2005 Netblender's primary product is the DoStudio line of Blu-ray authoring software. It is one of only three producers of professional Blu-ray authoring tools. Its software is aimed at both large budget studio productions and independent film makers.

Sony Creative Software purchased Netblender in October 2011.

== Products ==
=== Do Studio ===
Is one of only three professional Blu-ray encoding software products on the market today. Originally developed as an HD DVD-only tool, it was re-released in 2008 for Blu-ray. It is a complete BD-ROM spec compliant tool with AACS support, BDCMF formatting, BD-J support. The tool includes a point and click graphical user interface.

=== BD Touch ===
BD Touch is software that allows iPhones and other Wi-Fi enabled handheld devices to connect to a Blu-ray player. This connectivity has several uses. It allows to device to act as a remote control or keyboard interface to enter data into the player. It also allows media transfer between the Blu-ray player and the device, so that video can be downloaded to an iPhone. There is also a possibility of leveraging the interactive features of the Blu-ray disc and interface of an iPhone to create games where the hand held device interacts with the Blu-ray disc. The first title to be released using BD Touch was the French version of Iron Man.

=== Netblender Live ===
Netblender live is the latest release from Netblender and was introduced at the NAB show of 2009. The program is a complete technology solution for connecting rich media content to a Blu-ray Disc via an internet connection. NetBlender Live helps with the production of online features such as updateable trailers, dynamic Picture in Picture, downloadable bonus footage.

== Awards ==
Netblender was nominated for the Outstanding Achievement in Advanced Media Technology for the Non-Synchronous Enhancement of Original Television Content Award of the 58th Annual Technology & Engineering Emmy Awards. It was nominated for its work on the PBS DVD, A Cultivated Life: Thomas Jefferson and Wine.
