= Nero Linux =

- Developer: Nero AG
- Release: 2005; 21 years ago
- Final release: 4.0.0.0b / 22 December 2010; 15 years ago
- Operating system: Linux
- Type: Optical disc authoring software
- License: Freeware
- Website: https://www.nero.com/enu/downloads/previous-versions/download-linux4-update.php

Nero Linux is a port of Nero Burning ROM developed for various Linux distributions.

In March 2005, software publisher Nero AG offered free licenses for Nero Linux to users of the Microsoft Windows version. Applying the GTK+ widget toolkit, Glibc, and libstdc++, Nero Linux reproduced most of the features of Nero Burning ROM. Nero AG published the final update to Nero Linux in December 2010.

== Supported distributions ==
The list of supported distributions:

- Debian GNU/Linux 4.0 (or higher)
- Fedora 7.0 (or higher)
- Red Hat Enterprise Linux 5.0 (or higher)
- SUSE Linux 10.3 (or higher)
- Ubuntu 7.04 (or higher)

== Version history ==
Version number	Release date	Notes
Nero Linux
1.0	12 March 2005	First release
Nero Linux 2
2.1.0.4b	21 February 2007	Last release of Nero Linux version 2
Nero Linux 3
3.0.0.0	24 May 2007	GTK+ 2 port, Unicode support, Blu-ray burning.
3.0.2.1	6 November 2007	
3.1.1.0	13 February 2008	Based on NeroAPI version 7.20. Some command line arguments supported.
3.5	5 April 2008	
3.5.2.3	22 December 2008	
3.5.3.1	18 June 2009	
Nero Linux 4
4.0.0.0	17 September 2009	
4.0.0.0b	22 December 2010	Based on NeroAPI version 9.7.0.132
4.0.0.0-1	24 April 2012	Nero Linux Freeware

== See also ==
- Nero (software suite)
- Nero Digital
- Nero AAC Codec
- List of optical disc authoring software
