= HighMAT =

HighMAT (High Performance Media Access Technologies) is a media format jointly developed by Panasonic Corporation (Matsushita) and Microsoft for personal CD authoring with music and photo content.

== Support ==
Software to author HighMAT CDs transparently in Windows XP, as well as a Windows XP player for HighMAT content, can be downloaded from the official site.

HighMAT technology has been discontinued by Microsoft.

== Features ==
Burning photos and music content onto CD generally involves organizing the photos/music into directories. Since a CD can generally hold up to some 700 megabytes of data, this can mean over a hundred songs or thousands of photographs. When HighMAT was introduced, most stand-alone DVD players supported playback of MP3 and JPEG content, but the internal processing capacity of these units tended to make browsing large content libraries directly from CD very slow and tedious. HighMAT allows these stand-alone players to read lists of images and music content from the media faster, as well as providing a more convenient navigation system.
