= ISO Recorder Power Toy =

The ISO Recorder Power Toy is a shell extension that uses native Windows XP functions to add a new CD recording option to Windows XP's context menus, a CD burning software for Windows XP, Windows Server 2003, Windows Vista and Windows 7. The software, from hard drive folders, can create an ISO 9660 image, and burn an ISO 9660 image file to CD or DVD.

It is open source software released under a license similar to the BSD license with advertising clause. This, the unauthorized ISO Recorder Power Toy, along with other third party software, was mentioned by Ed Bott, a Microsoft Press author, in a Microsoft online article, named "Windows XP CD Burning Secrets".

The software:

- adds an Explorer menu item called "Create ISO image file" when you right-click on a folder;
- adds an Explorer menu item called "Copy image to CD" when you right-click on an ISO;
- associates itself with the .ISO extension.

Alex Feinman (MVP REconnect) wrote ISO Recorder, other utilities for Windows, and a TAPI wrapper.

On Windows XP, the software cannot create or burn anything larger than a CD. As of version 3.1, ISO Recorder is compatible with Windows 7.

Windows 8 can natively mount ISO files, Windows Vista or Windows 7 alone, cannot burn an ISO image. Office of Information Technology, University of Colorado Boulder recommends that you use ISO Recorder Power Toy.

== Versions ==
Latest is ISO Recorder 3.1.

- ISO Recorder V1 – for Windows XP Gold (no service pack) and Windows XP SP1
- ISO Recorder V2 – for Windows XP SP2/SP3 and Windows 2003 (including 64-bit OS)
- ISO Recorder V3 RC1 (June 2007)
- ISO Recorder V3 – for Windows Vista
- ISO Recorder V3.1 – for Windows Vista/Windows 7
