= UltraISO =

Optical disc authoring software

- A screenshot of UltraISO
- Developer(s): EZB Systems
- Initial release: April 20, 2002
- Stable release: 9.76.3860 / 8 July 2023; 2 years ago
- Operating system: Microsoft Windows
- Platform: IA-32 and x86-64
- Type: Optical disc authoring software and virtual drive
- License: Commercial
- Website: www.ezbsystems.com/ultraiso/

UltraISO is a crippleware application for Microsoft Windows for creating, modifying and converting ISO image files used for optical disc authoring, currently being produced by EZB Systems.

Initially UltraISO was shareware however since 2006 it has turned into commercial software. The 'Free Trial' version is limited to ISO images of 300 MB or less, effectively making it Crippleware.

== ISZ format ==
UltraISO uses a proprietary format known as ISZ. The format is advertised as "ISO Zipped", even though it is not a simple zip archive. The format uses zlib or bzip2 to compress the data, and may use AES-128,192 or 256 encryption in the CBC mode (note that this provides no integrity protection and is vulnerable to the padding oracle attack). The file format specification is available publicly on EZB Systems's website. The format is now supported by third-party applications such as Daemon Tools, Alcohol 120%, CDemu and isz-tool.

== See also ==
- List of optical disc authoring software
- Live USB
- Comparison of ISO image software
