= K3b =

Optical disc authoring software

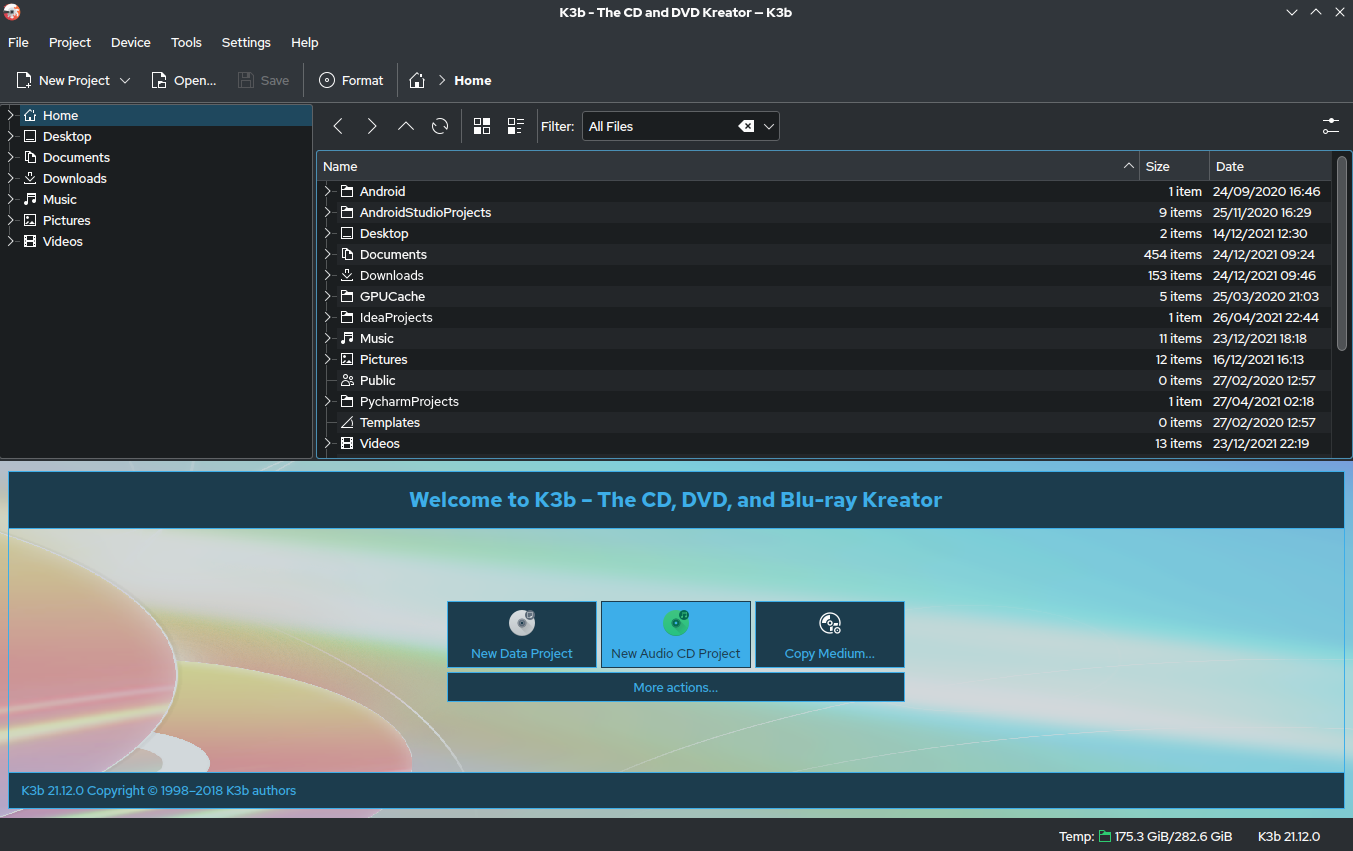
- Screenshot of K3b version 21.12.0 on Arch Linux
- Original author: Sebastian Trüg
- Developer: KDE
- Stable release: 25.12.0 / 11 December 2025; 10 months ago
- Written in: C++ (Qt)
- Operating system: Unix-like
- Platform: KDE Platform
- Type: Optical disc authoring
- License: GPL-2.0-or-later
- Website: apps.kde.org/k3b/
- Repository: invent.kde.org/multimedia/k3b

K3b (from KDE Burn Baby Burn) is a CD, DVD and Blu-ray authoring application by KDE for Unix-like computer operating systems. It provides a graphical user interface to perform most CD/DVD burning tasks like creating an Audio CD from a set of audio files or copying a CD/DVD, as well as more advanced tasks such as burning eMoviX CD/DVDs. It can also perform direct disc-to-disc copies.

== Overview ==
The program has many default settings which can be customized by more experienced users. The actual disc recording in K3b is done by the command line utilities cdrecord or cdrkit, cdrdao, and growisofs. K3b also features a built-in DVD ripper.

As is the case with most KDE applications, K3b is written in the C++ programming language and uses the Qt GUI toolkit. Released under the GNU General Public License, K3b is free software.

A first alpha of a KDE Platform 4 version of K3b was released on 22 April 2009, the second on 27 May 2009 and a third on 14 October 2009.

K3b is a software project that was started in 1998, and is one of the mainstays of the KDE desktop.

== Features ==
Some of K3b's main features include:

- Data CD/DVD burning
- Audio CD burning
- CD-Text support
- Blu-ray/DVD-R/DVD+R/DVD-RW/DVD+RW support
- CD-R/CD-RW support
- Mixed Mode CD (CD-DA and -ROM on one disc)
- Multisession CD
- Video CD/Video DVD authoring
- eMovix CD/eMovix DVD
- Disk-to-disk CD and DVD copying
- Erasing Rewritable discs
- ISO image support
- Ripping audio CDs, video CDs, video DVDs

K3b can also burn data CDs that support Universal Disk Format (UDF), Rock Ridge, and Joliet file systems.

== See also ==
- List of optical disc authoring software
- Comparison of DVD ripper software
- Brasero, a GTK+ optical disc authoring program.
