= ImgBurn =

Software for ripping CDs or burning CD media

- ImgBurn screenshot
- Developer(s): LIGHTNING UK!
- Initial release: 4 October 2005; 19 years ago
- Stable release: 2.5.8.0 / 16 June 2013; 11 years ago
- Written in: C++
- Operating system: Microsoft Windows; Wine officially supported
- Available in: Multilingual
- Type: CD/DVD authoring
- License: Freeware
- Website: www.imgburn.com

ImgBurn is an optical disc authoring program that allows the recording of many types of CD, DVD and Blu-ray images to recordable media (.cue files are supported as of version 2.4.0.0). Starting with version 2.0.0.0, ImgBurn can also burn files and data directly to CD or DVD. It is written in C++. It supports padding DVD-Video files so the layer break occurs on a proper cell boundary (where possible).

Prior to version 2.5.1.0, the program was freeware. From version 2.5.1.0 to 2.5.7.0, Ask.com adware was included in the installer. This was replaced in version 2.5.8.0 with OpenCandy adware. Only the version of the installer distributed directly from imgburn.com contains OpenCandy; the version distributed via the official mirror sites is adware-free. No notice is present on www.imgburn.com that the checksums/hashes provided now only match the OpenCandy version of the installer; however, the author of the program has provided the expected hash values for the adware-free version on the support forum.

== History ==
ImgBurn is an optical disc authoring software created by LIGHTNING UK, the author of DVD Decrypter, after he was forced to stop development of DVD Decrypter in response to a cease and desist order from Macrovision.

== Features ==
- Supported formats: BIN, CUE, DI (Atari Disk Image), DVD, GI, IMG, ISO, MDS, NRG, PDI and more.
- Ability to build DVD Video discs (from a VIDEO_TS folder), HD DVD Video discs (from a HVDVD_TS folder) and Blu-ray Video discs (from a BDAV / BDMV folder).
- Full unicode folder/file name support.
- Supported environments: Windows 95, 98, Me, NT4, 2000, XP, 2003, Vista, 2008, 7, 2008 R2, 8, 8.1, and 10 (including all the 64-bit versions). It also officially supports Wine.
- Image queue provides support for burning several images with minimum interaction.
- ImgBurn is relatively lightweight (compared to similar programs); under 1.8MB for all installed features.
- ImgBurn is based on the optical disc burning engine of DVD Decrypter; however, it does not have the ability to circumvent copy protections of encrypted DVDs. As of version 2.3.0.0, ImgBurn can create image files from unencrypted CDs/DVDs; however, it cannot remove Content Scramble System (CSS) encryption or any other copy protection. It is possible to use third-party software such as DVD43, an intermediate driver that operates between the hardware and software, for such purpose.

== Limits ==
- Does not support RAW disc ripping or burning
- Does not support multi-session discs
- Cannot write CD subchannel data
- Cannot copy discs directly, without first creating an image file
- Each session of the software can only burn to one drive at a time.

== Hardware interface support ==
ImgBurn supports many low-level drive access interfaces. This allows it to operate on almost all Windows platforms. ImgBurn can use any of the following interfaces:

- Advanced SCSI Programming Interface (ASPI) – WNASPI32.DLL (Adaptec)
- ASAPI – ASAPI.DLL (VOB Computersysteme/Pinnacle Systems)
- SCSI Pass Through Interface (SPTI) – Microsoft
- ElbyCDIO – Elaborate Bytes
- Patin-Couffin – VSO Software

== Inclusion of Adware ==
Version 2.5.8.0 of ImgBurn (current as of 2022) includes OpenCandy, a potentially unwanted program/adware.

== See also ==
- DVD Decrypter
- AnyDVD
- Digital Millennium Copyright Act
- InfraRecorder
- List of ISO image software
- List of optical disc authoring software
