= MagicISO =

Disc image software

- MagicISO running under Windows
- Developers: MagicISO, Inc.
- Final release: 5.5.281 / 21 February 2010; 16 years ago
- Operating system: Microsoft Windows
- Available in: English, Albanian, Chinese Simpilifed, Chinese Traditional, Danish, Dutch, French, German, Hungarian, Korean, Norwegian, Portuguese, Russian, Spanish and Swedish
- Type: Optical disc authoring software
- License: Shareware
- Website: www.magiciso.com

MagicDisc
- Final release: 2.7 (build 106) / 24 February 2009; 17 years ago
- Type: Virtual drive
- License: Freeware
- Website: www.magiciso.com/tutorials/miso-magicdisc-overview.htm

MagicISO (also referred to as MagicISO Maker) is a discontinued CD/DVD image shareware utility that can extract, edit, create, and burn disc image files. It offers the possibility of converting between ISO and CUE/BIN and their proprietary Universal Image Format disc image format.

== Features ==
Universal Image Format or UIF is a proprietary disc image format for CDs and DVDs designed for MagicISO. UIF adds compression, password-protected encryption, MD5 checksums, and multi-session images.

== See also ==
- List of ISO image software
