= X-CD-Roast =

Front-end for cdrtools

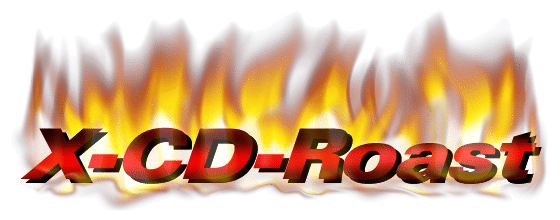
- Developer: Thomas Niederreiter
- Stable release: 1.19 / November 13, 2018; 7 years ago
- Written in: C, GTK+
- Operating system: Unix-like
- Type: Optical disc authoring
- License: GNU General Public License
- Website: xcdroast.org

X-CD-Roast is a GTK+ front-end for cdrtools which provides a graphical user interface (GUI) for CD authoring.

X-CD-Roast runs on Linux and other Unix-like computer operating systems. Released under the GNU General Public License, X-CD-Roast is free software.

== Features ==
- CD-Text reading/editing/writing support

== Comparison ==
X-CD-Roast was an early GUI front-end for unix-like systems, which has subsequently been reviewed as more primitive than other CD authoring software.
