= DVD Decrypter =

Microsoft Windows software application

- Screenshot of DVD Decrypter 3.5.4.0, the last version to be released
- Developer(s): Lightning UK!
- Final release: 3.5.4.0 / March 21, 2005; 20 years ago
- Operating system: Microsoft Windows
- Successor: ImgBurn
- Type: DVD ripper
- License: Freeware
- Website: www.dvddecrypter.com at the Wayback Machine (archived June 3, 2005) www.dvddecrypter.org.uk Unofficial mirror website

DVD Decrypter is a DVD ripper for Microsoft Windows that can copy DVD-Video discs to disc images. It can remove several types of digital rights management (DRM) and copy protection from DVDs, including Content Scramble System (CSS), DVD region codes, Analog Protection System, and User Operation Prohibitions (UOPs). DVD Decrypter can also burn DVD discs — functionality that the author has now incorporated into a separate product called ImgBurn.

== Legality in the United States ==
As DVD Decrypter facilitates the removal of copy restrictions, certain uses may be illegal under the United States Digital Millennium Copyright Act unless making copies that are covered under the Fair Use doctrine (or in some cases illegal even when making copies under fair use). In countries without similar laws there may not be any legal restrictions.

On June 6, 2005, the developer, Lightning UK!, announced via the CD Freaks website that he received a cease and desist letter from Macrovision. He later stated it was within his best interests to comply with the letter, and stopped development of the program. By June 7, 2005, a mirror site was up, which allowed people to download the final version (3.5.4.0). On November 27, 2005, Afterdawn.com, a Finnish website, announced that it complied with a letter received from Macrovision demanding that DVD Decrypter be taken down from its site.

Under United States federal law, making a backup copy of a DVD-Video or an audio CD by a consumer is legal under fair use protection. However, this provision of United States law conflicts with the Digital Millennium Copyright Act prohibition of so-called "circumvention measures" of copy protections.

In the "321" case, Federal District Judge Susan Illston of the Northern District of California, ruled that the backup copies made with software such as DVD Decrypter are legal but that distribution of the software used to make them is illegal.

In 2010, the Librarian of Congress instituted a DMCA exemption which protects circumvention of CSS protection under certain circumstances. This exemption expired in 2013.

On October 4, 2005, Lightning UK! continued the development of the burning engine used by DVD Decrypter in his new tool, ImgBurn. However, for legal reasons, ImgBurn does not have the ability to circumvent copy protections of encrypted DVDs.

== See also ==
- DeCSS
- DVD ripper (list of various related programs)
- AnyDVD
- DVD Shrink
