= DeepBurner =

- DeepBurner, ready to create a new compilation
- Developer(s): Astonsoft Ltd.
- Stable release: 1.9.0.228 / March 18, 2008
- Operating system: Windows XP, Windows Vista and Windows 7
- Type: Optical disc authoring software
- License: Proprietary: Free edition: Freeware; Pro edition: Shareware
- Website: www.deepburner.com

DeepBurner is a CD/DVD authoring program made by Astonsoft which supports CD-R, CD-RW, DVD-R, DVD-RW, DVD+R, DVD+RW and DVD-RAM. Additionally it can create and burn ISO images. It is available in a free or pro version. It is still maintained as of 2020.
