= Optical disc recording modes =

List of optical disc recording modes

In optical disc authoring, there are multiple modes for recording, including Disc-At-Once, Track-At-Once, and Session-At-Once.

== CD Disc-At-Once ==
Disc-At-Once (DAO) for CD-R media is a mode that masters the disc contents in one pass, rather than a track at a time as in Track At Once. DAO mode, unlike TAO mode, allows any amount of audio data (or no data at all) to be written in the "pre-gaps" between tracks.

One use of this technique, for example, is to burn track introductions to be played before each track starts. A CD player will generally display a negative time offset counting up to the next track when such pre-gap introductions play. Pre-gap audio before the first track of the CD makes it possible to burn an unnumbered, "hidden" audio track. This track can only be accessed by "rewinding" from the start of the first track, backwards into the pre-gap audio.

DAO recording is also the only way to write data to the unused R-W sub-channels. This allows for extended graphic and text features on an audio CD such as CD+G and CD-Text. It is also the only way to write audio files that link together seamlessly with no gaps, a technique often used in progressive rock, trance and other music genres.

== CD Track-At-Once ==
Track-At-Once (TAO) is a recording mode where the recording laser stops after each track is finished and two run-out blocks are written. One link block and four run-in blocks are written when the next track is recorded. TAO discs can have both data and audio at the same time.

There are 2 TAO writing modes:

- Mode 1
- Mode 2 XA

== DVD-R Disc At Once ==
Disc-At-Once (DAO) recording for DVD-R media is a mode in which all data is written sequentially to the disc in one uninterrupted recording session. The on-disk contents result in a lead-in area, followed by the data, and closed by a lead-out area. The data is addressable in sectors of 2048 bytes each, with the first sector address being zero. There are no run-out blocks as in CD-R disc-at-once.

== Session At Once ==
Session-At-Once (SAO) recording allows multiple sessions to be recorded and finalized on a single disc. The resulting disc can be read by computer drives, but sessions after the first are generally not readable by CD Audio equipment.

== Audio Master Quality Recording ==
Audio Master Quality Recording was introduced by Yamaha in 2002.

The feature is only available on some models, notably the Yamaha's CRW3200 and CRW-F1 series, and Plextor's Premium 2. CD Recorders with this feature are no longer manufactured.

It uses the Disc-At-Once method, usually at 1x, but some recorders allow for 4x and 8x speed mode. Since the pits and lands are longer, the quantity of information that can fit on a disc is less than with a normal method: 63 minutes instead of 74 minutes on a 650MB CD or 68 min instead 80 minutes on a 700MB CD.

== See also ==
- Packet writing
- Optical disc recording technologies
- Optimum Power Calibration
- cdrdao
