= InfraRecorder =

CD and DVD writing program

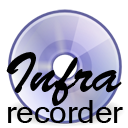

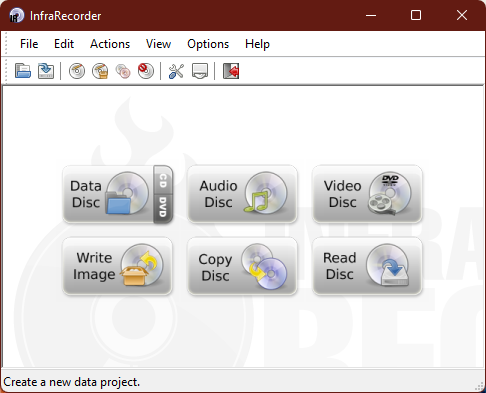
- Screenshot of InfraRecorder 0.53
- Original authors: Christian Kindahl and others
- Developer: Christian Kindahl
- Release: 10 September 2006; 20 years ago
- Stable release: 0.53 / 1 September 2012; 14 years ago
- Written in: C++
- Operating system: Microsoft Windows 2000 or higher
- Available in: Multilingual
- Type: Optical disc authoring
- License: GNU General Public License
- Website: infrarecorder.org
- Repository: github.com/kindahl/infrarecorder

InfraRecorder is an open-source CD and DVD writing program for Microsoft Windows. First started by Christian Kindahl in the Google Summer of Code 2006, InfraRecorder uses the cdrtools software library to perform the actual burning.

Since 0.46, InfraRecorder is released under the terms of the GNU General Public License 3 and is free software. In November 2007, CNET rated InfraRecorder the best free alternative to commercial DVD burning software.

InfraRecorder is included on the VALO-CD, a collection of open source software for Windows.

== Functionality ==
InfraRecorder supports disk rewriting and dual-layer DVDs. InfraRecorder can also burn a disc from an ISO image file. This program is portable on the Windows operating system.

As of version 0.40, InfraRecorder offers features similar to most CD- and DVD-authoring software, including the creation and burning of data and audio disc images, the ability to work with rewritable and multisession discs, and the ability to extract WAV and ISO image files from discs. One can also use the LAME MP3 encoder to save Audio CD tracks.

InfraRecorder is available in a version that will run natively on 64-bit versions of Windows; however, this version doesn't include an Ogg Vorbis decoder or libsnd library due to compilation difficulties with MinGW on the 64-bit Windows platform.

== See also ==
- List of optical disc authoring software
- List of ISO image software
