= Cdrdao =

Software application for authoring and ripping CD-ROMs

cdrdao
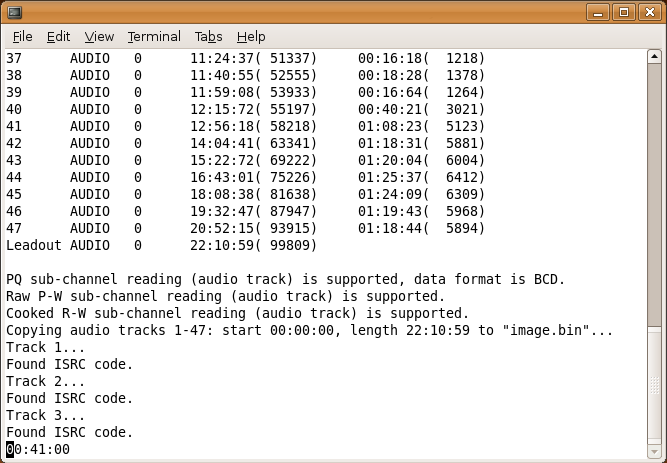
- cdrdao reading a CD
- Developers: Andreas Müller, Jonas Munsin, Manuel Clos, Denis Leroy
- Stable release: 1.2.6 / 5 December 2025; 7 months ago
- Written in: C++
- Operating system: Windows, Linux, macOS, Unix-like
- Available in: English
- Type: Disc imaging
- License: GPL 2.0 Or Later
- Website: cdrdao.sourceforge.net
- Repository: github.com/cdrdao/cdrdao

cdrdao (“CD recorder disc-at-once”) is a free and open source utility software application for authoring and ripping of audio and data CD-ROMs. It is licensed under GPL-2.0 or Later. The application is available for several operating systems, including Linux, Windows, and macOS, and was reported to work on other Unix-based operating systems.

cdrdao runs from command line and has no graphical user interface. Several programs for authoring and writing CDs depend on cdrdao and provide a GUI, such as K3b and Brasero, which was the default CD application for the GNOME desktop until around 2013.

== Features ==
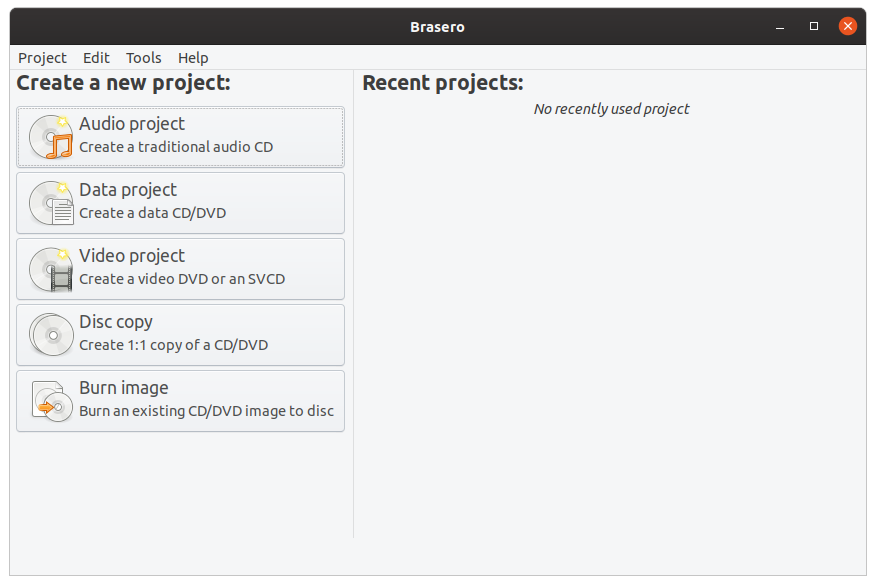
Brasero, a GUI frontend for cdrdao

cdrdao is capable of reading and writing audio, data, and mixed audio/data discs. It records audio or data CD-Rs in disk-at-once mode based on a textual description of the CD contents, known as a TOC (table of contents) file that can be created and customized inside a text editor. When reading CDs, cdrdao creates a binary dump of the data inside a BIN file and uses the TOC file to index it. The TOC file can be converted to a CUE file using the included toc2cue command. Using the TOC file, audio files can be burned to a disc in WAV format. cdrdao can copy discs, blank discs, create disc image files, and check CDDB information.

A key feature of cdrdao is its full control over the layout of the disc and its tracks. This gives it the ability to create non-standard gaps between audio tracks that are different than two seconds in length and contain non-zero audio data. It can also create hidden tracks and intro tracks.
