= Roxio =

American software company

- Type: Subsidiary
- Industry: Software
- Founded: 2001; 25 years ago
- Headquarters: Santa Clara, California, United States
- Key people: David Habiger (CEO); Paul Norris (EVP & CFO); Clay Leighton (EVP & COO); Mark Ely (EVP Strategy & GM); Matt DiMaria, (EVP & GM)
- Number of employees: 500+
- Parent: Alludo
- Divisions: Roxio Product Group; Premium Content Group
- Website: http://www.roxio.com

Roxio is an American software company specializing in developing consumer digital media products. Its product line includes tools for setting up digital media projects, media conversion software and content distribution systems. The company formed as a spin-off of Adaptec's software division in 2001 and acquired MGI Software in 2002.

In 2003, Roxio relaunched Napster as a competitor to iTunes, and partnered with Samsung to introduce a Napster-branded MP3 player, but the initiative saw limited success.

Sonic Solutions acquired Roxio in 2003, going on to acquire Simple Star and CinemaNow in 2008. Rovi Corporation acquired Sonic Solutions in 2010, but Rovi announced in January 2012 that it would sell Roxio to Canadian software company Corel. That acquisition closed on February 7, 2012.

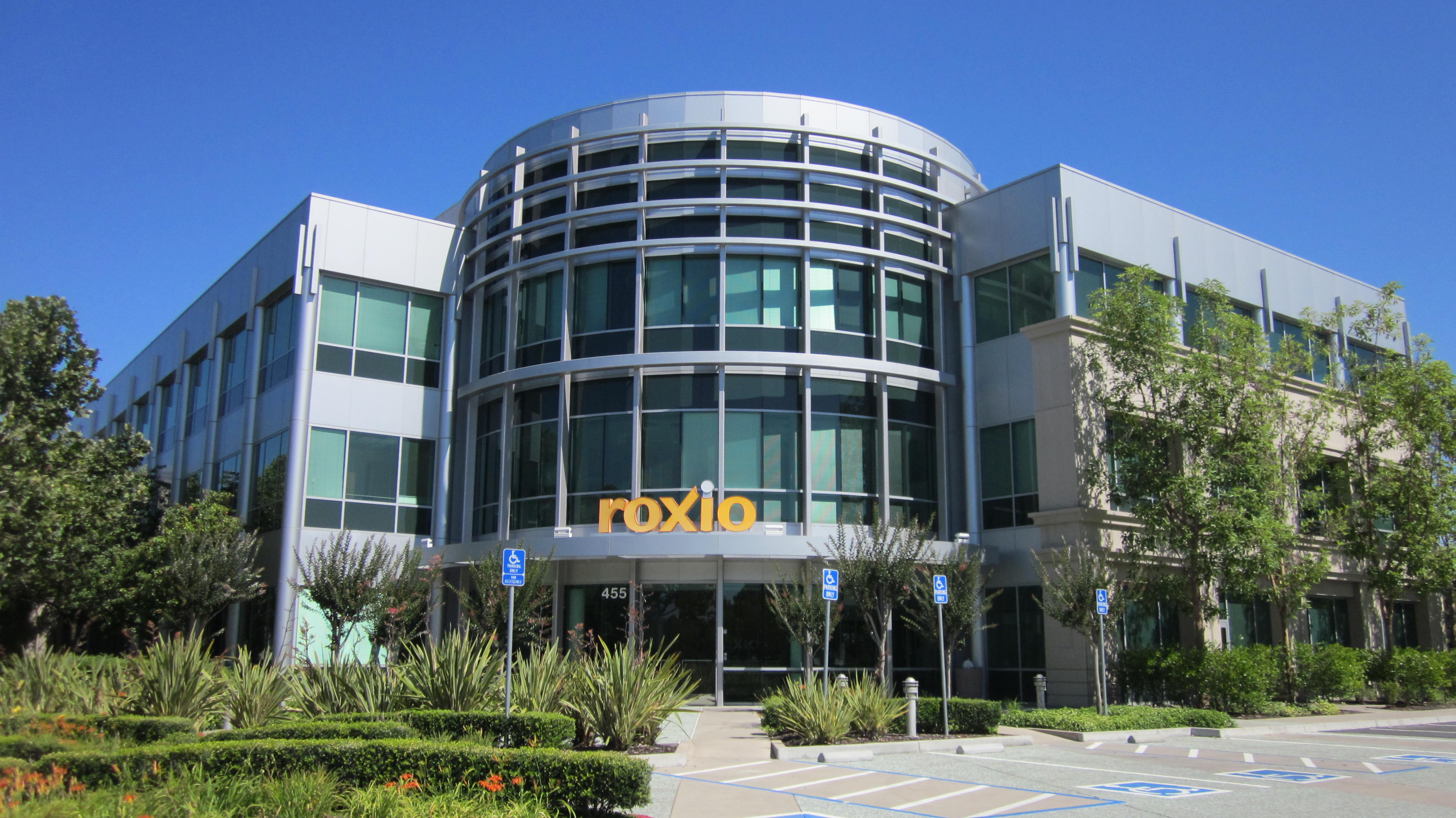
Roxio's former headquarters in Santa Clara, California

== Products ==
- Roxio Creator
- Roxio Toast
- Easy VHS to DVD
- Easy LP to MP3
- Popcorn
- DVDitPro
- PhotoShow
- RecordNow
- Back on Track
- Easy DVD Copy
- MyDVD
- Retrospect
- Roxio Game Capture
- Roxio Game Capture HD Pro
- Roxio Creator NXT 8
- Roxio Creator NXT Pro 8
