= Roxio Toast =

Disc authoring and media conversion software program

Astarte (later Roxio, Corel) Toast

- Toast version 9 in data pane
- Developer: Roxio
- Operating system: macOS
- Type: Optical disc authoring software
- License: Proprietary commercial software
- Website: Roxio Toast

Toast is an optical disc authoring and media conversion software application for macOS. Its name is a play on the word burn, a term used for the writing of information onto a disc through the use of a laser.

Discs can be burned directly through Mac OS X, but Toast provides added control over the process as well as extra features, including file recovery for damaged discs, cataloging and tracking of files burned to disc. It also provides support for audio and video formats that QuickTime does not support, such as FLAC and Ogg Vorbis.

== History ==
Toast was conceived of by Greg Kerr in 1993, then CEO of Astarte, who outsourced development to Markus Fest. In 1997, the product and team was purchased by Adaptec, and later transferred to Roxio (then a division of Adaptec).

Toast 4 is the last release that can run on System 7 with a 68k CPU. With version 5, Toast was renamed "Toast Titanium" and merged with a formerly separate application, Toast DVD. Toast 5 Titanium introduced support for Video CD and DVD burning, which was improved in version 6 by addition of MPEG-2 encoding.

Version 6 also added DVD authoring features, enabling the creation of video and photo DVDs with menus and buttons. Unlike Apple's iDVD, it supported external DVD burners. Its "ToastAnywhere" feature let users burn discs inserted in another Mac running Toast on the local network, through Apple's Rendezvous protocol. It also gained the ability to compress and encrypt files before burning them.

Toast 6 Titanium included another Roxio app, CD Spin Doctor 2, which can clean noise from an audio track.

Roxio announced Toast 8 Titanium in January 2007. Toast 8 Titanium added multiple features including TiVoToGo and Blu-ray support.

Roxio released Toast 20 Pro in 2021. This release required macOS 10.14 or later running on an Intel x86 processor. It also can run on Apple M-series CPUs using the Apple Rosetta binary translation software shim, although some reviewers report issues using Toast 20 Pro on Apple silicon.

As of April 2026, 5 years after the release of Toast 20 Pro, a newer version of Toast has not been released. So it is not clear whether Corel/Roxio ever will recompile Toast to run natively on Apple silicon.

== Features ==
Main features of the Toast 6 are: video and photo DVDs can have menus and buttons; package includes ToastAnywhere, that uses Apple's Bonjour protocol to support burning discs from other Macs on the local network; compression and 128-bit encryption of files and folders before burning; support for all audio and video codecs supported by QuickTime; improved interface; creation of slide shows with panning, zooming, transitions, and a soundtrack using the "Motion Pictures" feature.

== Reception ==
In a 2003 review of Toast 6, Macworld described Toast as "venerable" and the "reigning champ" of Mac disc-burning software.
