= CDBurnerXP =

Optical disc authoring utility for Windows

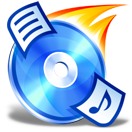

- CDBurnerXP 4
- Developer: Canneverbe Limited
- Release: February 18, 2003; 23 years ago
- Final release: 4.5.8.7128 (19 November 2019; 6 years ago) [±]
- Written in: VB.NET, C#
- Operating system: Windows 2000 and later; Windows Server 2003
- Platform: IA-32 and x64; .NET Framework 2.0 and later
- Available in: 36 languages
- List of languages English, Arabic, Bulgarian, Catalan, Chinese, Croatian, Czech, Danish, Dutch, Estonian, Finnish, French, Galician, Georgian, German, Greek, Hebrew, Hungarian, Italian, Japanese, Kazakh, Korean, Latvian, Lithuanian, Malaysian, Norwegian, Polish, Portuguese, Romanian, Russian, Serbian, Slovak, Slovenian, Spanish, Turkish, Ukrainian
- Type: Optical disc authoring
- License: Freeware
- Website: cdburnerxp.se

CDBurnerXP is an optical disc authoring utility for Windows 2000 and later, written mostly in Visual Basic .NET as of version 4, released in September 2007. It has international language support. The software is available to download in both 32-bit and 64-bit variants.

The program supports burning data on CD-R, CD-RW, DVD-R, DVD-RW, DVD+R, DVD+RW, Blu-ray Disc and HD DVD as well as burning audio files (WAV, MP3, MP2, FLAC, Windows Media Audio, AIFF, BWF (Broadcast WAV), Opus, and Ogg Vorbis in the Red Book format. ISO images can also be burnt and created via the program, along with UDF and/or ISO-9660 formats. Bootable data discs are also supported.

CDBurnerXP is freeware but closed source because it uses some proprietary libraries. The standard CDBurnerXP installer comes bundled with installCore but an installer without it can be downloaded. There are also versions for the x64 platform, a Windows Installer-based version for deployment via corporations and a portable version for putting onto USB or other types of media.

CDBurnerXP's final release was on 19 November 2019. The developer, Canneverbe Limited, stopped operating late 2022 and legally dissolved on 25 March 2025. The official website is no longer operational as of 15 April 2026 and it's unknown if it will be operational in the future.
