= Optical disc authoring =

Content publishing on optical disks

Optical disc authoring, including CD, DVD, and Blu-ray Disc authoring, is the process of assembling source material—video, audio or other data—into the proper logical volume format to then be recorded ("burned") onto an optical disc (typically a compact disc or DVD).

== Process ==
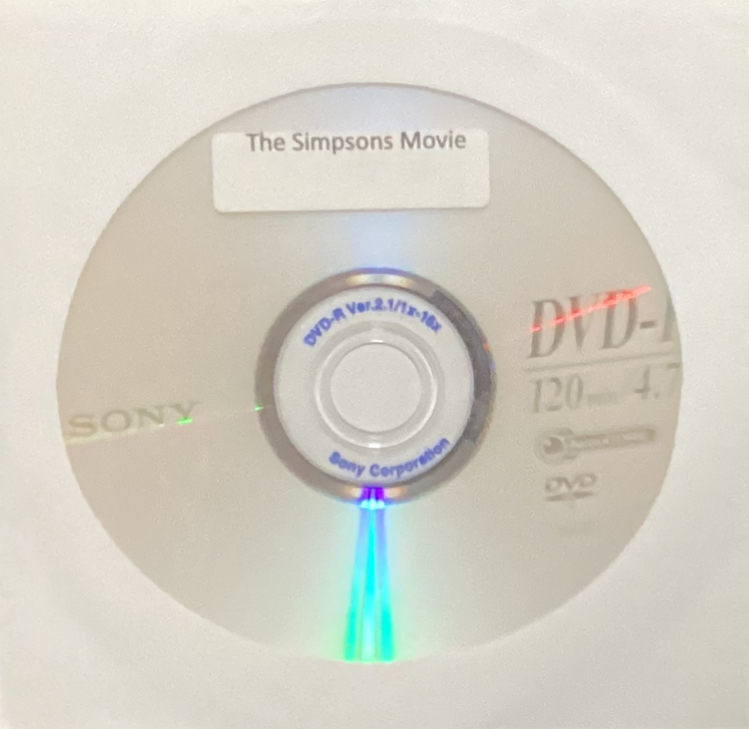
A burnt Sony DVD holding a pirated copy of The Simpsons Movie

To burn an optical disc, one usually first creates an optical disc image with a full file system, of a type designed for the optical disc, in temporary storage such as a file in another file system on a disk drive. One may test the image on target devices using rewriteable media such as CD-RW, DVD±RW and BD-RE. Then, one copies the image to the disc (usually write-once media for hard distribution).

Most optical disc authoring utilities create a disc image and copy it to the disc in one bundled operation, so that end-users often do not know the distinction between creating and burning. However, it is useful to know because creating the disc image is a time-consuming process, while copying the image is much faster. Most disc burning applications silently delete the image from the Temporary folder after making one copy. If users override this default, telling the application to preserve the image, they can reuse the image to create more copies. Otherwise, they must rebuild the image each time they want a copy.

Some packet-writing applications do not require writing the entire disc at once, but allow writing of different parts at different times. This allows a user to construct a disc incrementally, as it could be on a rewritable medium like a floppy disk or rewritable CD. However, if the disc is non-rewritable, a given bit can be written only once. Due to this limitation, a non-rewritable disc whose burn failed for any reason cannot be repaired. (Such a disc is colloquially termed a "coaster", a reference to a beverage coaster.)

There are many optical disc authoring technologies for optimizing the authoring process and preventing errors. Some programs can mount a disc image as a file system type, so these images appear as mounted discs. The disc image can then be tested after it is assembled but before writing to a physical disc.

== Sessions ==
DVD and Blu-ray (sequential) discs also allow the use of multiple sessions.

=== Tracks ===
Tracks contain the information to be stored on the disc. A track is a consecutive set of sectors on the disc containing a block of data. One session may contain one or more tracks of the same or different types. Tracks can be audio information or data, which use the same format, or video information. Data can include album information and low-resolution graphics such as karaoke lyrics; however, these tracks are not compliant with the Red Book of CD audio standards.

== Hardware ==
Authoring is commonly done in software on computers with optical disc recorders. There are, however, stand-alone devices like personal video recorders which can also author and record discs.

== Software ==
Use of optical disc recorders require optical disc authoring software, sometimes called "burning applications" or "burner applications". Such software is usually sold with the recorder. Some operating systems come bundled with them.

Creating an optical disc usually involves first creating an optical disc image with a full file system designed for the optical disc, and then actually burning the image to the disc. Many programs create the disc image and burn in one bundled application (Quick Copy or Copy On-the-fly), such that end-users do not even know the distinction.

Disc file systems include ISO 9660 (often known simply as “ISO”) and Universal Disk Format (UDF). ISO is most common for CDs and UDF is most common for DVDs.

There are also packet writing applications that do not require writing the entire disc at once, but allow writing parts at a time, allowing the disc to be used as a random access removable medium (somewhat like a very large floppy, though with unique constraints).

Sometimes, disc images are made to make the authoring process more straightforward. Sometimes disc images are even used to emulate the presence of a CD-ROM or DVD drive with the data entirely resident on the hard disc.

For the command-line tool cdrdao, a so-called TOC file that can be authored inside a text editor is used to specify the details of the desired disc record.

== File systems ==
Optical disc file system types include ISO 9660 (often known simply as "ISO") and Universal Disk Format (UDF). ISO is most common for CDs and UDF is most common for DVDs and BDs.

=== ISO 9660 ===
ISO 9660 is a format mainly used on CDs. The ISO 9660 can be extended with El Torito, Joliet, Rock Ridge, or the Apple ISO 9660 Extensions.

El Torito makes it possible to boot from a CD. The Joliet extension by Microsoft makes it possible to have long file names encoded in UCS-2, among other things. Rock Ridge is a system providing file-ownership, fewer restrictions on the file names, and more. Amiga extensions allow use of Amiga-specific attribute bits and comments. The Apple Extensions enables Macintosh-specific creator codes, file type, and so on.

=== Universal Disk Format ===
Universal Disk Format (UDF) is a newer filesystem that comes with additional features such as Unicode support, packet writing (UDF 1.50), and defect management on rewritable formats. Packet writing can alternatively be implemented with UDF 1.02 and Mount Rainier extensions. It allows one to use the disc like a floppy disk, that is to easily delete, create, and modify files, without having to write the whole disc again.

DVD-Video uses UDF 1.02, however Blu-Ray Disc uses UDF 2.50.

=== HighMAT ===
A compatibility technology called HighMAT allows visual material on the disc to be recognised, interpreted and supported by electronic play devices more efficiently.

== See also ==
- Compact disc manufacturing
- List of optical disc authoring software
- Comparison of optical disc authoring software
- Rainbow Books (optical disc data standards)
- Optical disc recording technologies
- Optical disc recording modes
- DVD authoring
- DVD recorder
