= Wise Solutions =

Wise Solutions, Inc.
- Formerly: Great Lakes Business Solutions (1994–1998)
- Industry: Software development
- Founded: 1994; 32 years ago
- Founders: John McMillan; Brien Witkowski
- Defunct: 2013
- Headquarters: Plymouth, Michigan
- Parent: Altiris, Inc. (from 2003)

Wise Solutions, Inc. started by John McMillan and Brien Witkowski was an American company that made software tools for creating application installers. Their primary product, Wise was one of the most widely used installation packages for Windows. Their other competitors were InstallShield by Flexera Software and InstallAware. Wise Solutions was acquired and became a wholly owned subsidiary of Altiris, Inc. in December 2003. In April 2007, Altiris was acquired by Symantec Corporation.

Wise Solutions was started as a shareware tool originally distributed via CompuServe. Over time the company grew to roughly 300 employees spread across the headquarters in Plymouth, Michigan and a European office in The Hague, Netherlands. After the 2003 acquisition by Altiris the European office was consolidated with an existing European Altiris office. By 2013 when the Wise products were end-of-lifed the Plymouth Michigan office was then primarily a regional software development and support site for existing Wise branded products and some Altiris branded products.

== Company history ==
- 1992 Witkowski with boyhood friend John McMillan at the Oakland University developed the prototype of the Wise Installer application and offered it as shareware on the old CompuServe computer forums.
- 1994 Great Lakes Business Solutions (GLBS) has been founded
- 1995 GLBS moved to an 800 square foot office on Ford Road in Canton
- 1997 GLBS licensed its installation and software patching technologies to Microsoft to help simplify software installation for Microsoft SMS customers
- 1998 GLBS moved to an 17,000-square-foot headquarters in the Canton Ford Crossing office complex. GLBS became Wise Solutions with 62 employees.
- 1999 Wise Solutions Inc. grown rate was at least 30 percent a year and named one of the fastest growing companies in the country by Inc. magazine. Wise Solutions did $6 million in business.
- December 2001 Wise Solutions Inc. moved to 7911 Halyard Drive, Plymouth, Michigan 48170
- 2003 Wise Solutions has been acquired by Altiris for $43 million
- 2007 Altiris was acquired by Symantec Corporation
- 2011 Symantec decided to end-of-life the Wise products
- 2013 Wise Package Studio, the last remaining Wise product was end-of-lifed by Symantec on November 7, 2013.

== WISE Installation System ==
Wise Installation System is a tool for creating Windows setup programs based on WiseScript, which later was renamed to Wise InstallBuild, InstallMaker or InstallMaster and but back to Wise Installation System in version 9.

Wise Installation System started 1992 as a shareware tool originally distributed via CompuServe. In 1994 John McMillan and Brien Witkowski founded Great Lakes Business Solutions (GLBS). Wise Installation System Version 4 became available by GLBS in 1995. Wise Installation System Version 5 was released in 1996. GLBS did separate the application into two different products. Wise Installation System and Wise Installation System Enterprise Edition.

Wise Installation System Version 6 was released in 1998 and the first Version released by Wise Solutions, Inc. The logos, products and product features got trademarks. This Version was a game changer for Wise Solutions. The new feature SetupCapture will become in Wise for Windows Installer an important feature for system administrators in order to repackage legacy vendor software packages into Microsoft Windows Installer (MSI) technology.

Features included WebDeploy, SmartPatch, SetupCapture, Click an Script and the tag line was "Making Work Easier For You". Wise Installation System Version 8 has been renamed by Wise Solutions Inc. in 1999. Wise Installation System had 3 variants for version 8: InstallBuilder (Standard), InstallMaker (Professional), InstallMaster (Enterprise). Version 9 was reduced to 2 variants: Standard Edition and Professional Edition.

== Legal issues ==
=== Corporate espionage ===
On June 27, 2003, InstallShield sued Wise Solutions, alleging electronic espionage. The civil complaint listed the theft of nearly 1,000 confidential documents from the InstallShield corporate FTP site, including a customer list. InstallShield detected the intrusion when decoy customers with addresses planted in InstallShield's customer-list started to receive marketing material from Wise Solutions. Reviews of FTP logs showed several connections over a period of 10 months from addresses related to Wise Solutions. This lawsuit also spawned an investigation by the FBI that resulted in the Plymouth headquarters being searched for evidence. The civil suit was resolved in July 2004 and the case was dismissed. Additionally, the U.S. Attorney's office in Chicago sent a letter indicating that they did not intend to file criminal charges.

=== Patent infringement ===
In more recent years InstallShield and Wise Solutions via their respective parent companies have had some disagreements over patent infringement, one of which ultimately resulted in a preemptive patent-infringement lawsuit by Macrovision against Altiris and Wise Solutions in which it not only claimed infringement by Altiris products but also asked (November 2006) for the court to find that it was not infringing on any Altiris or Wise Solutions patents.

== See also ==
- List of installation software
