= List of installation software =

The following is a list of applications for building installation programs, organized by platform support.

== Cross-platform ==
Name	Developer	Platforms	Status	License
Installer VISE	MindVision Software	Windows, Mac OS X	Discontinued	Trialware
NSIS	Nullsoft	Windows, Mac OS X, Linux	Active	Multiple (free software licenses, primarily the zlib license.)

== Windows ==
Name	Developer	Status	License	Can build Windows Installer packages?	Can build MSIX packages?	Can Capture?
Actual Installer	Softeza Dev.	Active	Freeware (proprietary)	No	No	
IExpress	Microsoft (Part of Windows)	Active	Freeware (proprietary)	No	No	
Inno Setup	Jordan Russell and Martijn Laan	Active	Modified BSD license	No	No	
InstallAware	InstallAware Software	Active	Trialware	Yes	Yes	Yes
InstallCore	InstallCore	Discontinued	Software as a service	No		
InstallShield	Flexera Software	Active	Trialware	Yes	Yes	No
NSIS	Nullsoft	Active	zlib License	No	No	
Orca (Part of Windows SDK)	Microsoft	Active	Freeware (proprietary)	Yes; exclusively		
Wise	Wise Solutions, Inc.	Discontinued	Non-free	No		
WiX	FireGiant	Active	Open Source Maintenance Fee	Yes; exclusively	Yes	No

== macOS ==
Name	Developer	Status	License
Installer	Apple Inc.	Active	Included with macOS
Remote Install Mac OS X	Apple Inc.	Discontinued	Included with Mac OS X

== AmigaOS ==
Name	Developer	Status	License
InstallerLG	Ola Söder	Active	AROS Public License
Installer	Commodore International	Discontinued	Included with AmigaOS

== See also ==
- List of software package management systems
