= EMCO Remote Installer =

- Developer(s): EMCO Software
- Stable release: 4.1.5 (May 22, 2013; 11 years ago) [±]
- Operating system: Windows XP and later
- Size: 61.9 MB
- Available in: English
- Type: Software inventory and installation
- License: Freemium
- Website: emcosoftware.com/remote-installer

EMCO Remote Installer is a software distribution tool for Windows. It allows network administrators to install and uninstall software on remote Windows computers connected to a local network, and to audit installed software and Windows updates remotely.

== Functionality ==
EMCO Remote Installer allows network administrators to install, uninstall and audit installed software on remote Windows computers across a local network. The remote installation, uninstallation and audit operations can be executed on multiple remote computers in parallel. Such operations can be initiated either manually or scheduled for automatic execution.

The application supports remote installation of EXE setups, MSI and MSP packages. All the supported types of packages are installed on remote PCs silently. To install an EXE installation, a user should specify the command-line parameters activating the silent installation mode or provide an installation scenario file. MSI and MSP packages are installed silently using the standard installation options.

EMCO Remote Installer allows auditing software and OS updates installed on remote PCs. The application extracts information about the installed software from remote PCs and stores it in a database enabling the user to generate software inventory reports. The collected software inventory information is used to uninstall applications and updates. A user can select software installed on remote PCs to uninstall it remotely. Remote uninstallation is performed silently. To uninstall software that was installed using EXE setups, a user should specify the command-line parameters activating the silent uninstallation mode or provide an uninstallation scenario file. Software installed using MSI and MSP packages is uninstalled silently using the standard options.

=== Key features and functions ===
- Remote silent installation and uninstallation of x86 and x64 EXE/MSI/MSP packages
- Software distribution to multiple remote PCs in parallel
- Remote audit of installed software
- Installation/uninstallation of multiple packages at once
- Execution of custom pre- and post-installation actions
- Scheduler that supports execution of one-time and recurrent remote operations

=== Free and Professional editions ===
EMCO Remote Installer is available in two editions. The Free edition is free for personal and commercial usage and includes features to audit installed software and to install/uninstall up to five installation packages on up to five remote PCs at a time. The Professional edition requires a commercial license and includes the full range of all the available features.

=== Functionality limitations ===
EMCO Remote Installer collects information from remote PCs on installed applications and updates that were installed "per machine". Software installed "per user" (i.e. installed in a particular Windows user account) is not detected by the application. Remote installation and uninstallation operations can work with "per machine" installations only.

== Alternatives ==
Remote software deployment features are usually available in various centralized management solutions. In a Windows domain network, administrators can distribute software remotely using a group policy object (GPO). GPO supports deployment of MSI packages. Other types of installations should be deployed using ZAP files. Microsoft System Center Configuration Manager (SCCM) also offers advanced distribution options, including silent deployment of EXE and MSI/MSP packages.

== See also ==
- LANDesk
- Novell ZENworks
