= Genieo =

Israeli company specializing in Mac malware

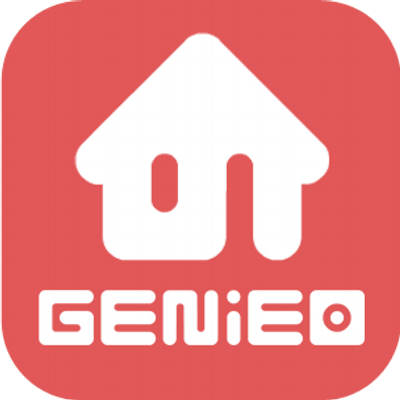
- Developer: Genieo Innovation
- Release: March 2010
- Operating system: macOS
- Platform: Macintosh
- Available in: English
- Type: Adware, user tracking software
- License: Adware
- Website: genieo.com

Genieo Innovation is an Israeli company, specializing in unwanted software which includes advertising and user tracking software, commonly referred to as a potentially unwanted program, adware, privacy-invasive software, grayware, or malware. They are best known for Genieo, an application of this type. They also own and operate InstallMac which distributes additional 'optional' search modifying software with other applications. In 2014, Genieo Innovation was acquired for $34 million by Somoto, another company which "bundles legitimate applications with offers for additional third party applications that may be unwanted by the user". This sector of the Israeli software industry is frequently referred to as Download Valley.

== History ==
Genieo Innovation was founded in April 2008 by Sol Tzvi and Jacob Tenenboem.

The first version of Genieo was released in September 2009, and the beta version was launched at the Demo2010 conference in March 2010.

Genieo's website has been down and it is suspected that it has changed its name to InKeepr.

== Overview ==
The software installs itself onto computers and makes it almost impossible for users to remove it. It hijacks the user's browser and tracks browser usage with the intention of mining information. Users complain that it acts like a virus and they need to run special programs to remove it.

== Malware issues ==
Genieo is listed as malware in Apple Inc.'s XProtect anti-malware service, which built in to all Macintosh computers running Mac OS X Snow Leopard or later.

In May 2013, a malicious installer, was found by security software company Intego. The installer masquerades as a necessary update to Adobe Flash Player and attempts to install Genieo.app without user interaction. Dynamic libraries are added to the Safari browser, which intercept searches intended for Bing and Google.

Other versions of Genieo for Mac have also been offered as 'codecs' required for video playback. Testing carried out on Genieo for Mac in June 2013 found that it left active software behind even after using the supplied uninstaller, which required detailed manual removal.

In November 2013, another fake application installer was reported to include Genieo adware.

In January 2014, Sophos added Genieo for Mac to their threat list; in the category Viruses and Spyware : Trojan horse (computing) : Adware.

As of November 2014, Genieo for Mac is flagged by Intego (mentioned above) and, according to an analysis at VirusTotal, by 25 (out of 55 surveyed) anti-malware solutions, including Ad-Aware, Avast!, Bitdefender, Comodo, Dr. Web, ESET, Fortinet, F-Secure, Kaspersky, Trend Micro Housecall, Sophos and Symantec.

In July 2014, Genieo was acquired for $34 million by Somoto, an installation system developer.

In August 2015, malware researchers discovered a Genieo installer which acquired access to the Mac keychain, by an automated click on "allow", when the permission dialog for the keychain was displayed. The code was in a Safari browser extension added by Genieo, and was also contained, but not immediately used, in earlier versions of the installer.

== See also ==
- Spyware
- Personalization
- Adaptive hypermedia
- Behavioral targeting
