= InstallCore =

Content distribution platform

- Developer: IronSource
- Initial release: 2009; 16 years ago
- Website: www.installcore.com

InstallCore (stylized as installCore) was an installation and content distribution platform created by ironSource, considered potentially unwanted programs (PUP) by a number of anti-malware vendors. It included a software development kit (SDK) for Windows and Mac OS X. The program allowed those using it for distribution to include monetization by advertisements or charging for installation, and made its installations invisible to the user and its anti-virus software.

The platform and its programs have been rated potentially unwanted programs (PUP) or potentially unwanted applications (PUA) by anti-malware product vendors since 2014, and by Windows Defender Antivirus since 2015.

The platform was primarily designed for efficient web-based deployment of various types of application software. As of August 2012, InstallCore was managing 100 million installations every month, offering services for paid, unpaid, and free software by using the SDK version.

== History ==
The InstallCore team introduced the first version of the SDK at the beginning of 2011. The SDK was a fork of the FoxTab installer and had only basic Installation features.

InstallCore was discontinued as part of a company flotation in late 2020.

== Criticism and malware classification ==
InstallCore and its software packages have been classified as potentially unwanted programs (PUP) or potentially unwanted applications (PUA), by anti-malware product vendors and Windows Defender Antivirus from 2014–2015 onwards, with many stating that it installs adware and other additional PUPs. Malwarebytes identified the program as "a family of bundlers that installs more than one application on the user's computer". It has been described as "crossing the line into full-blown malware" and a "nasty Trojan".

== See also ==
- List of installation software
