= Gigi Levy-Weiss =

Israeli businessman and investor

- גיגי לוי-וייס
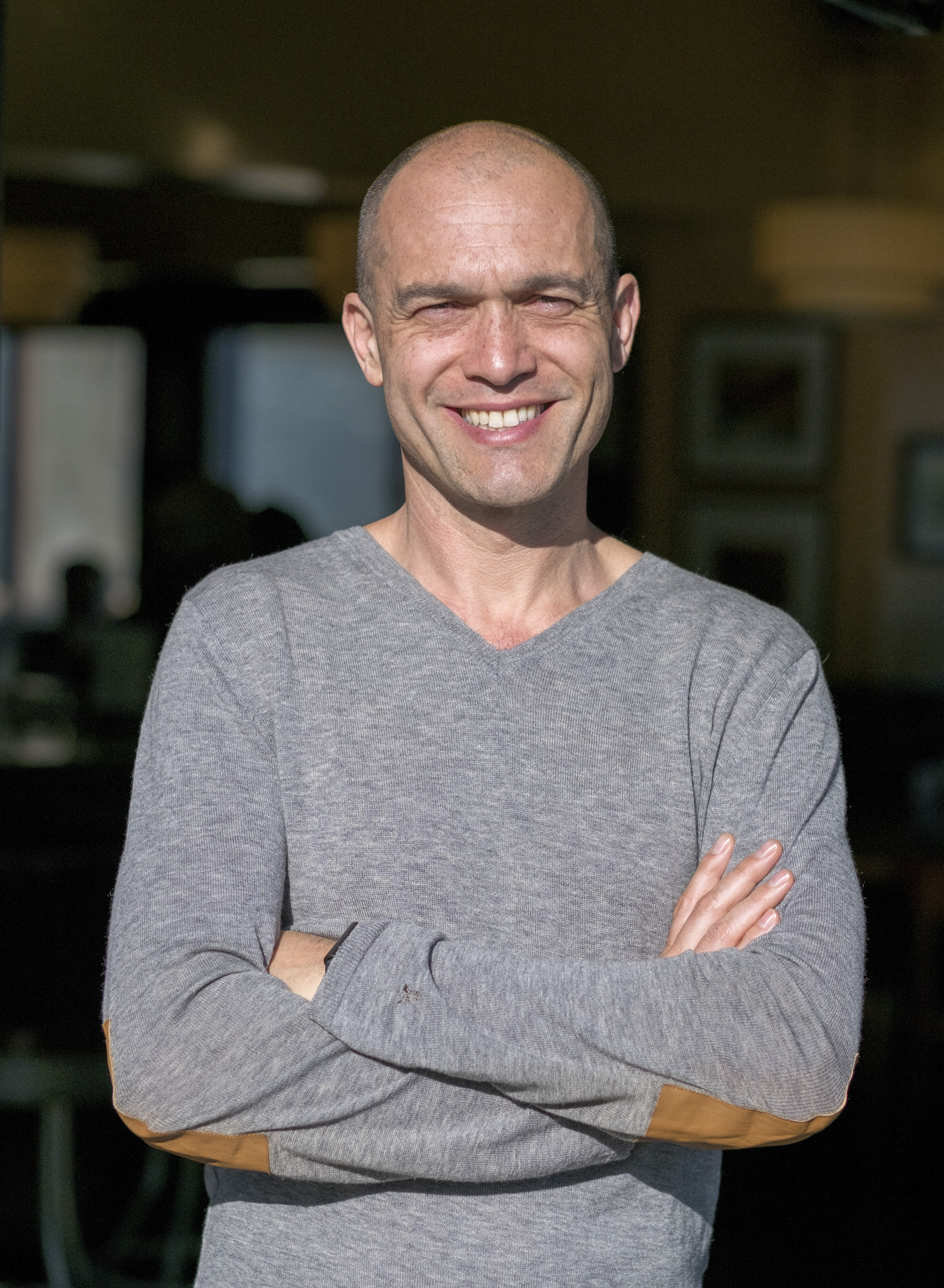
- Born: Gigi Levy; Israel
- Education: Kellogg School of Management; Tel Aviv University
- Occupations: Businessman, investor
- Known for: Former CEO of 888 Holdings; Founding partner at NFX Guild
- Spouse: Daphi Levy-Weiss
- Children: 3

Gigi Levy-Weiss (Hebrew: גיגי לוי-וייס; born Gigi Levy, Israel) is an Israeli businessman and investor. He is a co-founder and partner of the investment firm and business accelerator NFX. He works primarily with internet, software and gaming companies.

He is the former CEO for online gambling company 888 Holdings, and is on the board of the Israeli-Palestinian nonprofit organization MEET.

== Early life and education ==
Levy (later Levy-Weiss) was born and raised in Israel. Before attending college Levy-Weiss was a pilot in the Israeli Air Force. In October 2002 he started attending the Kellogg Graduate School of Management at Northwestern University in Evanston, IL, where he earned his MBA in May 2004.

== Career ==
Early in his career Levy-Weiss worked with his own startup company, also holding a number of management and consulting positions with technology companies in Israel and the UK. Among those roles he was CEO of Giltek Telecommunication, a publicly traded telecom systems integrator.

From 2003 to 2005 he was Vice President of Western Europe for Amdocs Limited, an international telecommunications software company. The following year he became Division President for the company for Western Europe, and Central and Latin America.

On June 18, 2006, Levy-Weiss joined the international sports betting company and gambling website operator 888 Holdings as their Chief Operating Officer (COO). He was COO until January 2007, when he became the company's CEO. His tenure coincided with the 2006 enactment of US online gambling legislation UIGEA and the 2008 financial crisis. His position as a CEO officially ended on May 31, 2011, though he remained on the board for an additional twelve months, assisting in the transition to a new CEO.

After leaving 888 Holdings, Levy-Weiss has been an investor, board member, and in some cases a co-founder for a number of technology companies in Israel, San Francisco and London. Many of the startups he invests in have involved online commerce, advertising technologies, mobile applications, gaming, and SaaS spaces.

From 2007 until its acquisition in 2016 by Taiwan's GMobi, he was a board member at Massive Impact. He was an investor and board member for SweetIM from 2009 to 2013, which was acquired by Perion. Perion purchased SweetPacks, maker of SweetIM, in November 2012 for approximately $41 million.

Levy-Weiss was one of the founders of digital entertainment company Playtika in 2010. In 2011, over half of Playtika's shares were acquired by casino operator Harrah's Entertainment's at a company value of $80–90 million, in what was the largest acquisition on record of an Israeli online gaming company. The total sum of the two stages of the buyout for Playtika was rumored to be around US$140 million.

Israeli company Promodity, an advertising platform, announced in August 2012 that Levy-Weiss had invested in the company. In 2014, he sold his assets in the company. He has been a board member at Global-e since 2013, and late that year he invested in Space Ape Games, an English social games company.

He also has invested in startups such as the technology company Kenshoo. Other investments include companies Crossrider (later acquired for $37million), Plarium, R2Net, Eyeview, RealMatch, Lovelive.tv, NonoRep, Gooodjob, Selina, Superfly, SpeakingPal, Ekoloko, TradeO, Zoomd, Moovu, and Moolta, (which was acquired by SimilarWeb) and Clawee.

In 2014, Levy-Weiss was appointed to Facebook's EMEA Client Council, a marketing forum including representatives from brands and agencies of Europe, Africa and the Middle East, together with Facebook leaders.

In 2015, Levy-Weiss cofounded the accelerator and funding firm NFX Guild in the San Francisco Bay Area with James Currier and Stan Chudnovsky. NFX is named for "Network Effects."

In 2015 Levy-Weiss co-founded Beach Bum, a gaming company focused on classic hit card and board games. Beach Bum was acquired by the French hyper-casual gaming company Voodoo in 2021.

In 2016, Levy-Weiss was part of a group of investors that led a Series A funding round for Inception, an Israeli startup specializing in virtual reality entertainment content.

== Public service ==
Levy-Weiss has been involved with a number of non-profit organizations in Israel, notably on the management board for Israeli humanitarian fund Latet from 2008 to 2013. He became a board member at the non-profit MEET - Middle East Entrepreneurs of Tomorrow in November 2013.

He also sits on the advisory boards of non-profit tech initiatives Place-il and KamaTech.

In 2023 Levy-Weiss was active in creating the Israeli High-Tech protest, Tech for Democracy, which opposes the legal reform of the Israeli government.

After the October 7 attacks, Levy-Weiss co-founded Brothers and Sisters for Israel, an organization of IDF reservists devoted to relief and aid for civilians and soldiers. The organization received the Presidential Award for Volunteerism from the President of the State of Israel.

At Tel Aviv University, his alma mater, Levy-Weiss is on the advisory board of the Technology Management, Innovation and Entrepreneurship MBA program. He joined the supervisory board at Bertelsmann SE & Co. KGaA in Germany in May 2015.

He has been a speaker at conferences such as Com.vention, Casual Connect, and others.

== Personal life ==
Levy-Weiss and his wife, Daphi Levy-Weiss, live in the Israel coastal city of Ramat HaSharon with their three children.
