= IWZ =

IWZ may refer to:

- Impact Wrestling Zone
- InstallShield WiZard (Project file extension used by InstallShield Express 1.0 and 2.x)
