= Beach Bum Ltd. =

Gaming company

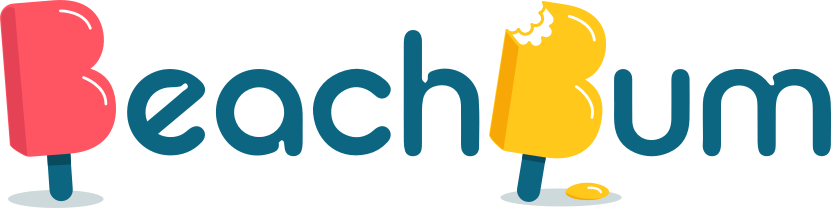
- Type: Private
- Industry: Video games
- Founded: 2015; 11 years ago
- Founders: Gigi Levy-Weiss; Uri Shahak; Shachar Schalka; Keren Marom; Gil Levi
- Headquarters: Ra'anana, Israel
- Key people: Shachar Schalka (CEO); Keren Marom (COO); Gil Levi (GM)
- Products: Online games, Mobile games
- Revenue: ▲US$70 million (2021)
- Number of employees: 264 (2026)
- Parent: Voodoo
- Website: bbumgames.com

Beach Bum Ltd. is an Israeli digital entertainment company specializing in the development and publication of mobile games. In 2021, Beach Bum Ltd. had over 2 million monthly active users.

== History ==
Beach Bum Ltd. was founded in 2015 by Gigi Levy-Weiss and Uri Shahak (who previously founded Playtika), Shachar Schalka (CEO), Keren Marom (COO), and Gil Levi (GM) The Ra'anana-based company specializes in the development of board games for mobile phones.

In 2020, company profits doubled due to the COVID-19 pandemic.

As of 2021, the company raised $14 million from Saban Ventures and North83.

In 2021, the company was acquired by the French video game company Voodoo.

== Games ==
- Backgammon - Lord of the Board: Live, competitive backgammon.
- Spades Royale: Classic trick-taking card game.
- Gin Rummy Stars: Popular multiplayer rummy card game.
- Domino Go: Online multiplayer dominoes.
- Rummy Rush: Fast-paced online rummy.
- OPA!: A family-friendly card matching game.
- Tilez: Online tile-matching family game.
- Wild Run: Adventures: A social racing/adventure game.
