= Claw machine =

Type of arcade game

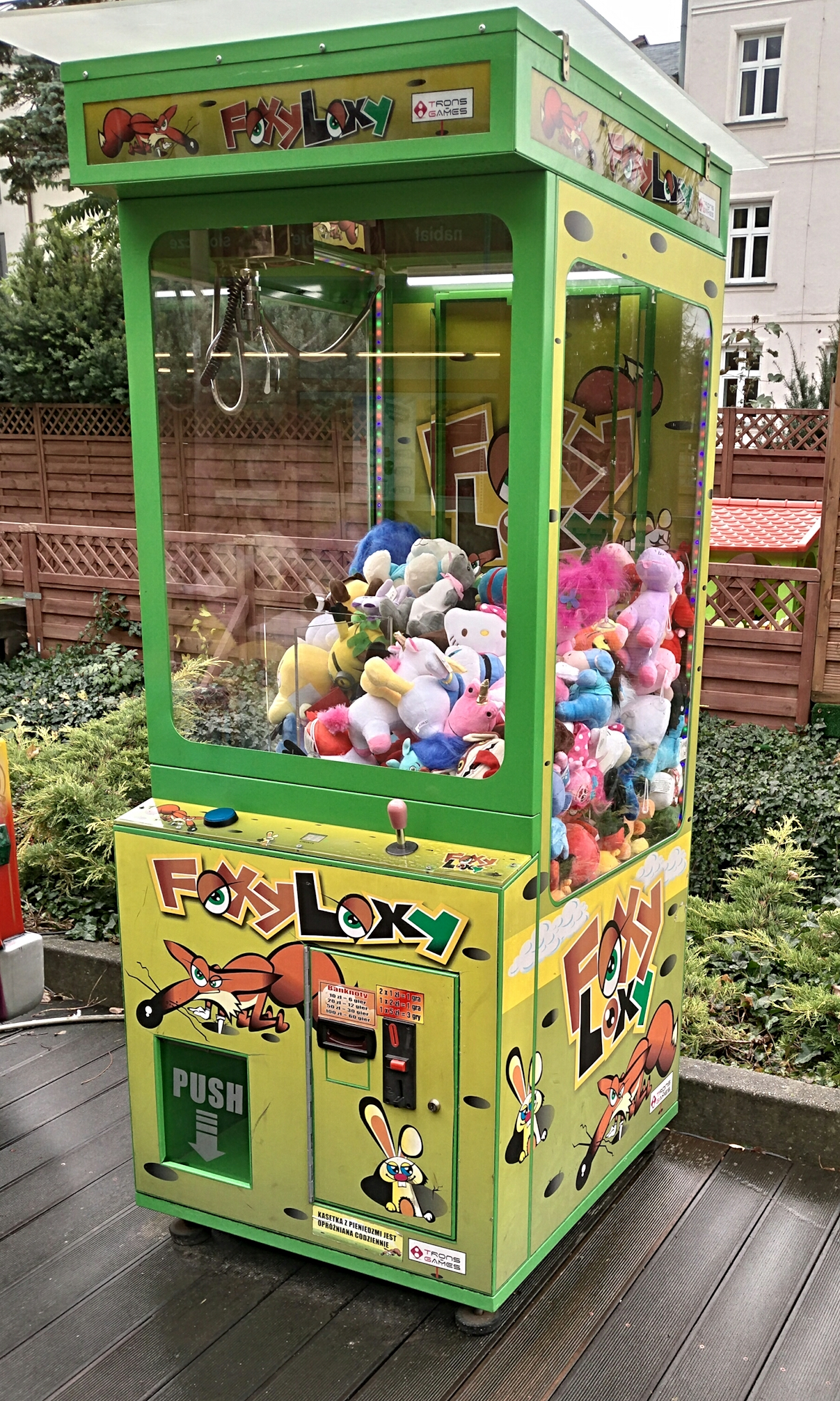
A claw machine in Ustroń, Poland

A claw machine is a type of arcade game. Modern claw machines are upright cabinets with glass boxes that are lit from the inside and have a joystick-controlled claw at the top, which is coin-operated and positioned over a pile of prizes, dropped into the pile, and picked up to unload the prize or lack thereof into a chute. They typically contain stuffed toys or other cheap prizes, and sometimes contain more expensive items like electronic devices and fashion accessories. Claw machines are also known as skill cranes, claw cranes, crane games and teddy pickers, and are known as UFO catchers in Japan because of the claws' resemblance to UFOs.

The earliest claw machines are believed to have been created in the late 19th century and inspired by the machines used to build the Panama Canal, while the first patented claw machine, the Erie Digger, was inspired by the creation of the Erie Canal and invented in 1926. It and its successor, the Miami Digger, were popular throughout the United States during the 1930s, specifically during the Great Depression, as carnival attractions and as furniture in public places. By the 1980s, claw machines were ubiquitous in both the United States and Japan; the success of Sega's UFO Catcher machines in the 1980s and 1990s inspired a claw machine craze in the latter country. Claw machines have made appearances in numerous video games, music videos, films, and television shows since at least the 1990s.

In the late 2010s, claw machines became immensely popular in South Korea and Taiwan as cheap entertainment because their economies were slowing at the time, with the number of claw machine arcades in both places rising into the thousands. Also in the 2010s, claw machines that could be remotely controlled via mobile applications or websites began turning up online.

Claw machines are often rigged to modify the claw's strength on each turn, and are consequently considered gambling devices in some jurisdictions.

== Early history ==
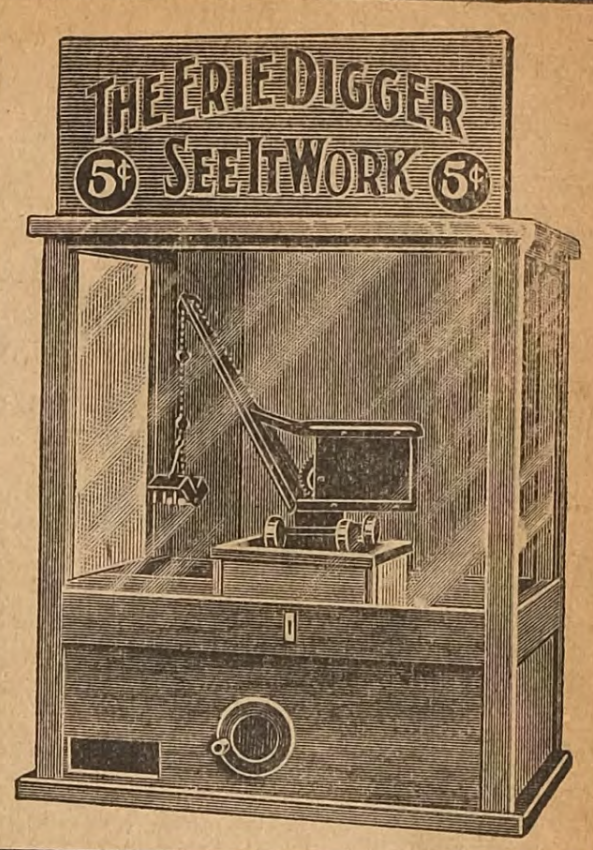
Illustration of an Erie Digger in a 1927 issue of The Billboard

Claw machines are believed to have originated in the United States in the 1890s, when they were made to resemble the machines that built the Panama Canal. The first patented claw machine, the Erie Digger, was a glass box containing candy and other small objects, a chute, and a coin-operated miniature steam shovel that moved in an arc, could be moved with a handle, and could be lifted and dropped into the chute using a hand crank. It was invented in 1926, manufactured by the Erie Manufacturing Company, and named after the construction of the Erie Canal. It found success at carnivals, partially because it did not require electricity like other carnival attractions. Throughout the 1930s, it saw use as furniture in train stations, hotels, drugstores, cigar stores, and bus stations, where it was used to keep customers entertained. During the Great Depression, designing intricate, Art Deco claw machines for hotels and stores became a lucrative endeavor.

The Miami Digger, invented by American carnival operator William Bartlett of Miami and patented by him in 1932, improved upon the design of the Erie Digger by using an electric motor and allowing the crane to move around the entire box. It was also known as the Nickel Digger, as it contained money, such as nickels and silver dollars, as prizes; premium versions of the diggers had watches and cigarette lighters as prizes for adults. At the peak of his success, Bartlett had over 40,000 claw machines in the field. He became rich from the popularity of the machines, eventually dying in 1948.

== Global popularity ==
=== Asia ===
==== Japan ====
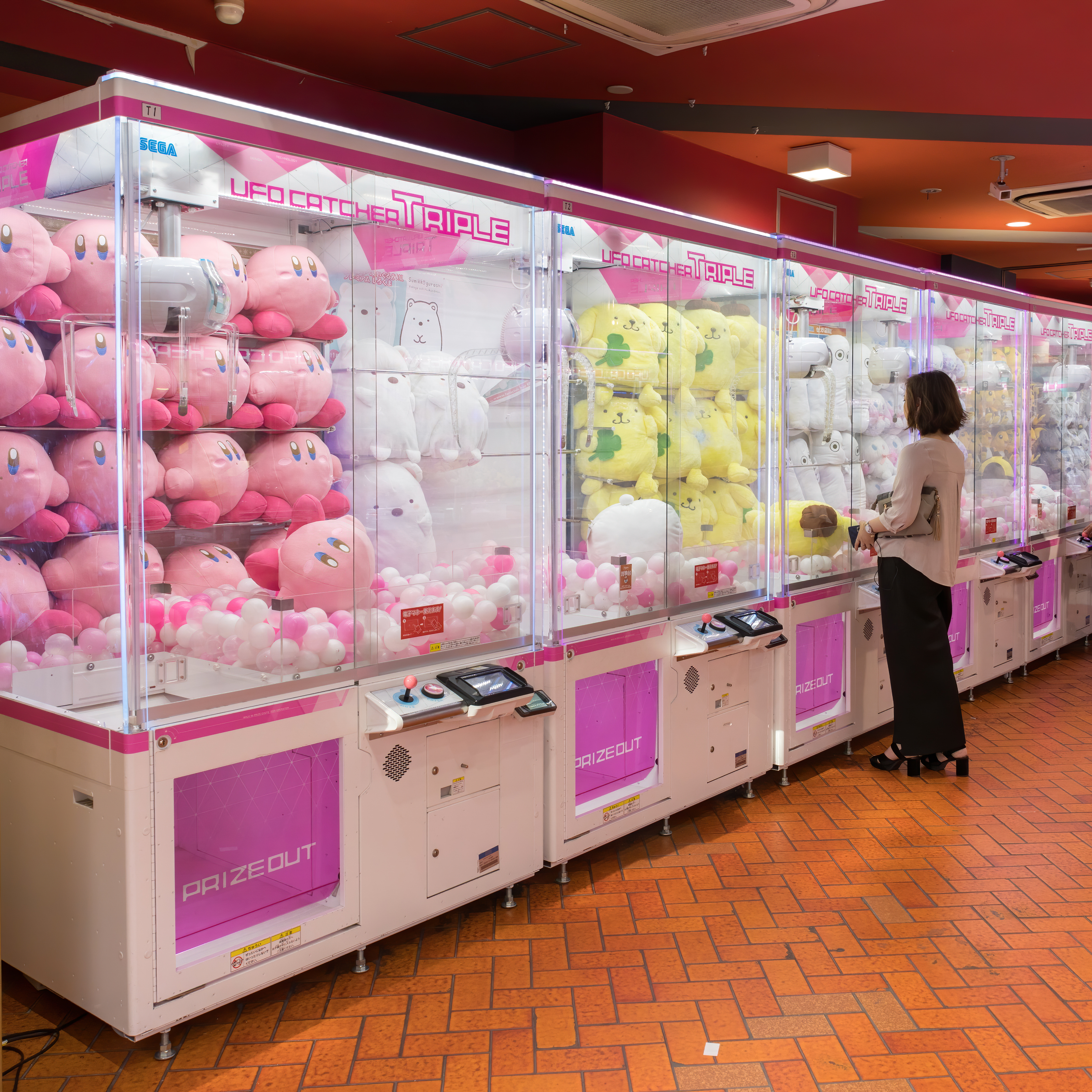
A row of UFO catchers in Akihabara, Tokyo, 2019

Japanese companies Sega and Taito began designing trolley-style claw machines in the 1960s. They gained popularity in Japan during the late 1970s, with crane games ranking among Japan's top ten highest-grossing electro-mechanical (EM) arcade games of 1977 and 1978. Sega released their UFO Catcher claw machine in 1985 and made their first shipment of it in 1986. It had sold 10,000 cabinets by 1991, its popularity inspiring Sega's creation of the Dream Catcher in 1989 and the New UFO Catcher in 1991 while making the UFO Catcher series responsible for 90 percent of stuffed toy claw machine sales. By 1994, its claw could be changed to fit the sizes and shapes of different prizes, and it had become a craze across Japan: arcades started dedicating entire floors to UFO Catcher cabinets—of which Sega had sold over 40,000, making it Sega's best-selling game at the time—and the term "UFO catcher" became synonymous with crane games in Japan.

Sega Shinjuku Kabukicho, a two-story Sega arcade in Shinjuku, Tokyo containing 477 claw machines, received the Guinness World Record for having the most claw machines in a single venue in 2021, a record previously held by the Taito Station in Fuchū, Tokyo for having 454 machines. As of 2023, Yuka Nakajima of Japan holds the Guinness World Record for being the most successful claw machine player due to winning more than 3,500 Rilakkuma teddy bears from claw machines. In 2021, claw machines accounted for more than half of the revenue at Japanese arcades, according to the Japan Amusement Industry Association. Japanese claw machines can also contain cakes as prizes.

==== South Korea ====
The number of claw machine arcades and the popularity of claw machines both experienced a sharp increase in South Korea in 2016 and 2017, specifically in Seoul neighborhoods with universities like Hongdae and Sinchon. From 2015 to 2017, the number of South Korean claw arcades increased from 20 to 1,900, while mentions of claw machines on Korean social networks also increased during that time. Korea JoongAng Daily and The Korea Herald attributed the increased interest to South Korea's harsh economy at the time leading to a desire for cheap entertainment, while U.S. News & World Report associated it with the country's increasing youth unemployment.

==== Taiwan ====
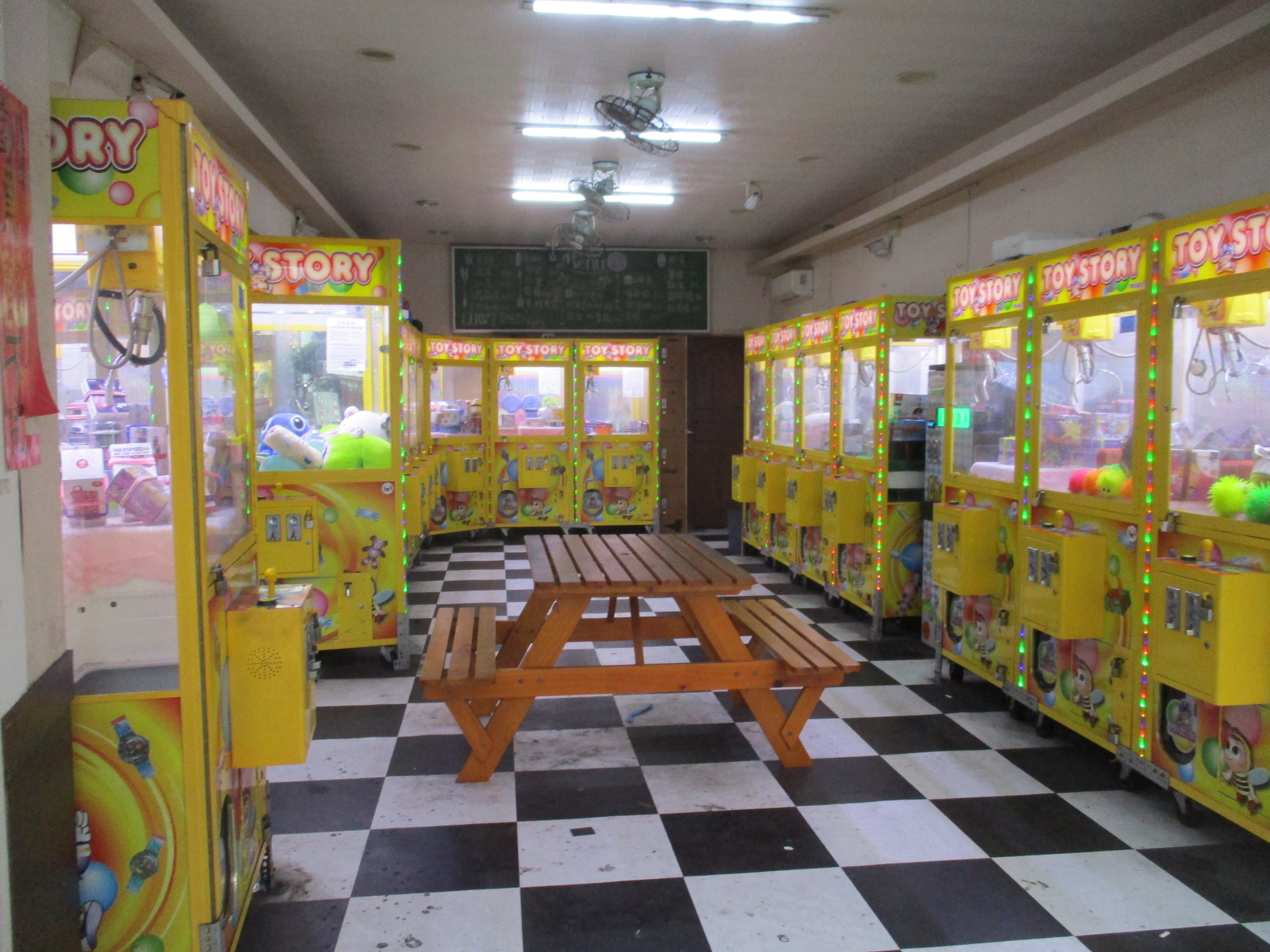
A claw machine arcade in Hsinchu, Taiwan

In Taiwan, where claw machine arcades are usually open all day and owners sublet their machines to different operators, claw machines became especially popular as inexpensive entertainment starting in 2017, due to their costing NT$10 to use. The number of claw machine arcades in Taiwan increased from 920 in 2016 to 3,353 in 2018 and, as of 2019, there are more than 10,000. A 2018 survey of children aged seven to 18 reported 32.7 percent of them using claw machines one to three days a week and over four percent using them every day. The Central Bank of the Republic of China increased their budget in 2019 to produce more NT$10 coins to accommodate the increasing popularity of claw machines in Taiwan. By 2018, the average monthly revenue for operating a claw machine was around NT$5,000.

==== China ====
The largest claw machine arcade in China, LJJ Station in Beijing, has more than 60 machines with stuffed toy versions of characters from WeChat animations. Before 2020, claw machines were popular in Thai shopping malls; a 2020 survey conducted by the advocacy group No Gambling Youth Club stated that 75 of the 92 shopping malls surveyed contained 1,300 claw machines collectively.

==== Philippines ====
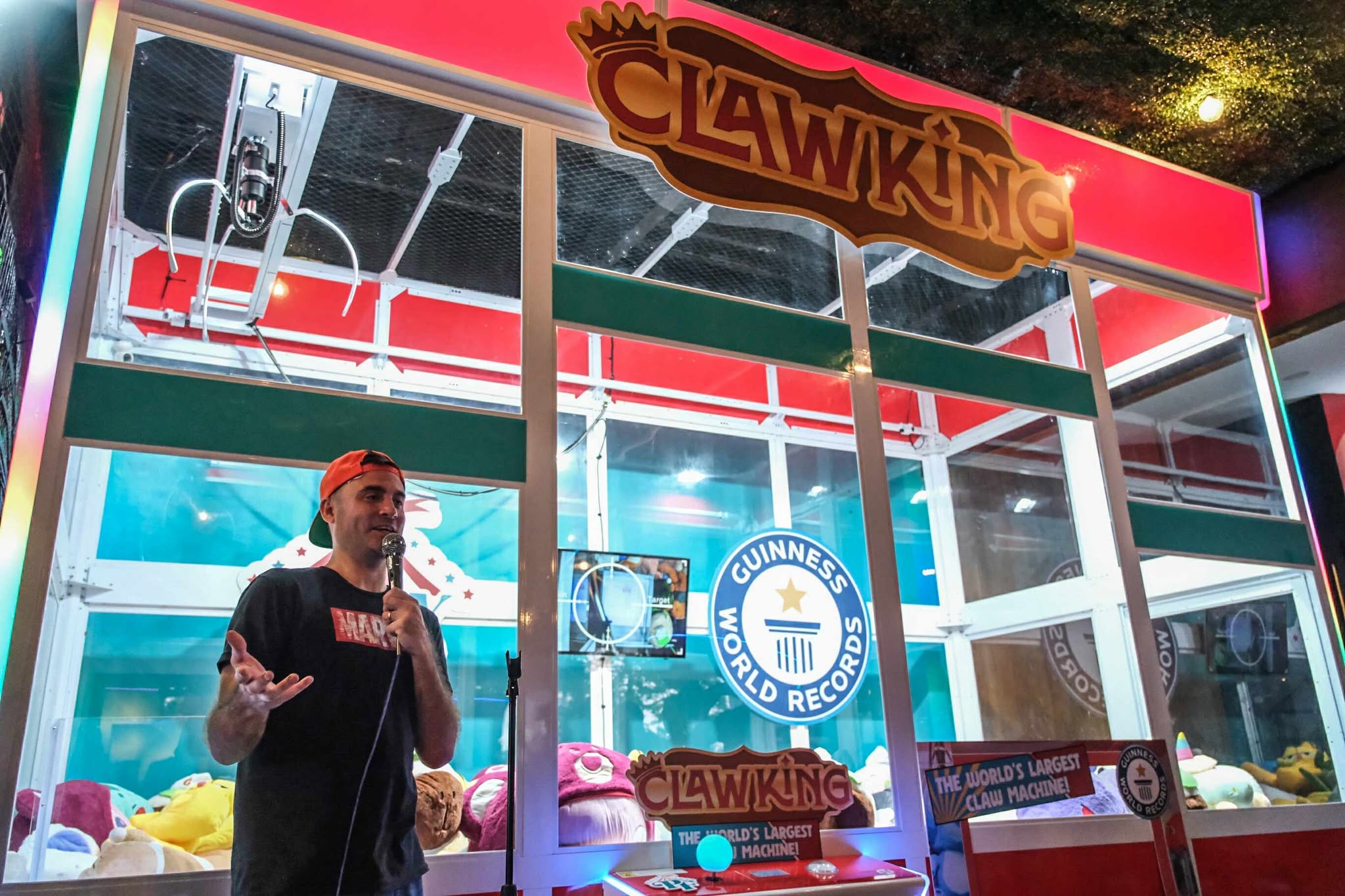
The "Claw King", the world's second-largest claw machine

The world's second-largest claw machine, Claw King, was built by Kuya Magik and is located at PlayFair, an arcade in Cebu City, Philippines. At the time of its opening, it was the world's largest claw machine with an area of 49.90 m^{3} (1,761 ft^{3}). PlayFair added the machine with the goal of blending local Perya culture with modern entertainment. The record was broken in 2026 by Butlin's Bognor Regis Resort in the United Kingdom.

=== United States ===
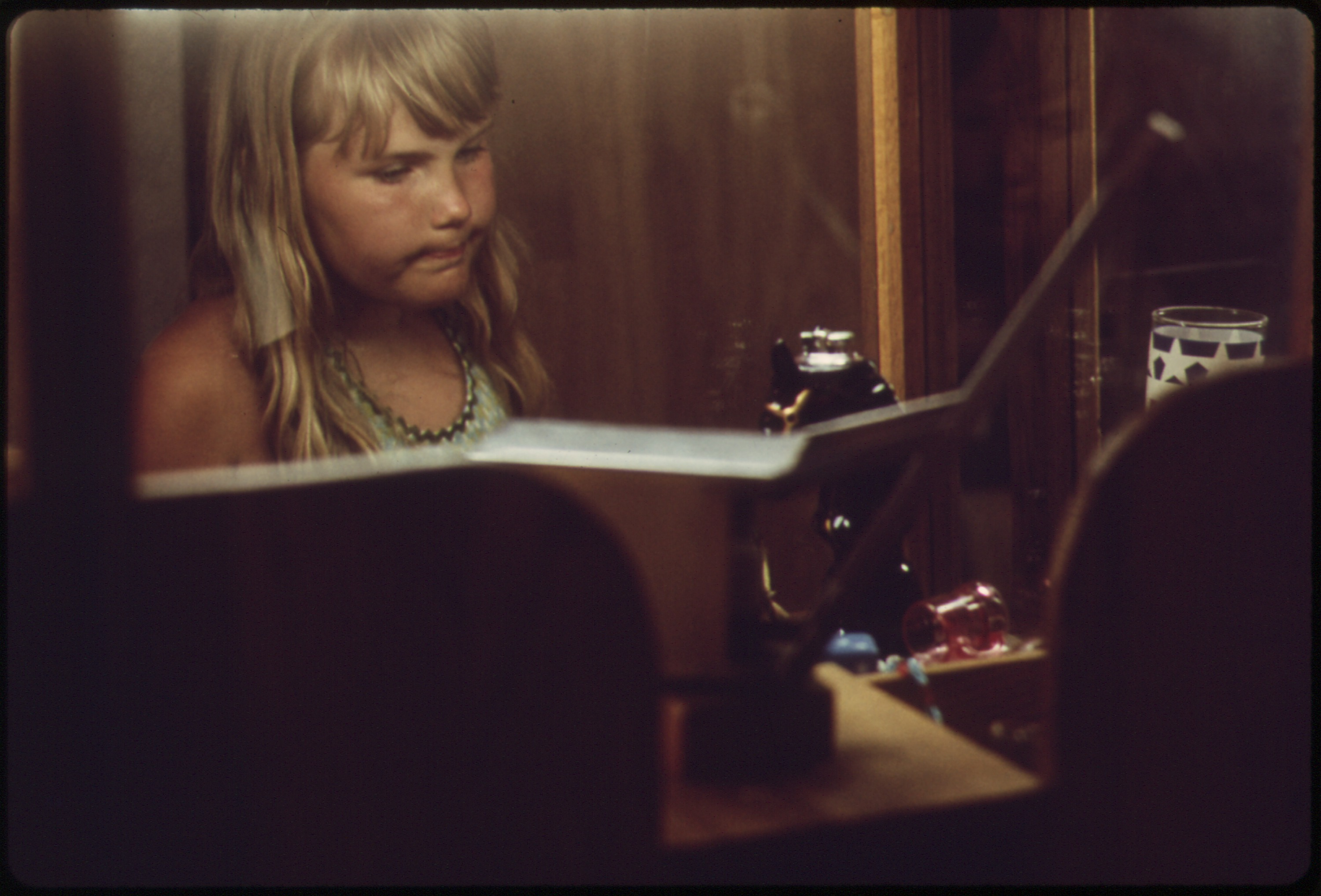
A girl using a claw machine at the Lake of the Ozarks State Park in Missouri, U.S., 1973

In the United States, claw machines became ubiquitous in the 1980s. They are common at carnivals, grocery stores, shopping malls, arcades, amusement parks, and bowling alleys.

The term "Clawcade" is used in the USA to refer to arcades that exclusively feature claw machines and prize-winning games. In 2023, Claw World, a 2,400 square foot clawcade opened to the public in Las Vegas.

There were many instances of children getting stuck inside of claw machines in the United States throughout the 2010s, including in Tennessee, New York, Kentucky, Nebraska, Pennsylvania, North Carolina, and Texas.

=== Online and popular culture ===
Online claw machines are claw machines controlled remotely online, with prizes that get shipped to users' homes upon being won. Since the 2010s, mobile apps, such as Clawee in Israel, ClawCrazy in the United States and Sega Catcher Online in Japan, and websites, such as Netch in Japan and the Santa Claw in the United States, have allowed users to remotely use claw machines stored in warehouses in their respective countries.

The 1993 Nintendo Entertainment System (NES) video game Kirby's Adventure includes a minigame based on the UFO Catcher, while the 1998 PlayStation game Bomberman World has a UFO catcher-themed battle stage. Sega's 2005 video game Yakuza, its prequel, Yakuza 0, and its remake, Yakuza Kiwami, also feature UFO Catcher machines. The 2019 video game Link's Awakening includes a claw machine as a side activity. In the 1995 film Toy Story, Buzz Lightyear and Sheriff Woody climb into a claw vending machine filled with claw-worshipping aliens. In the SpongeBob SquarePants episode "Skill Crane" from its fourth season, Squidward becomes addicted to trying to win a prize from a claw machine. Claw machines have also been featured in the music videos for Delta Heavy's 2019 song "Take Me Home", Corpsegrinder's 2022 song "Bottom Dweller", and the City Girls' 2022 song "Good Love".

== Legality ==
=== North America ===
The passing of the Johnson Act by Congress in 1951, which prohibited the transfer of electronic gambling devices across state lines, led to Miami Diggers at carnivals being destroyed by operators or seized by government officials. Carnival owner Lee Moss organized other carnival owners together to protest against the classification of the diggers as gambling machines. Because of this, a compromise was soon reached that allowed carnival owners to keep the diggers but required them to be manually operated with no coin slot and prizes that were not money and worth one dollar or less, while the government would tax each machine US$10. Regulations loosened in 1973 as the Federal Bureau of Investigation (FBI) abandoned the Johnson Act. As of 2015, state regulations generally require that claw machines contain less valuable prizes. Most states exempt claw machines from their gambling laws.

In response to a spate of lawsuits against California claw game operators, attorney Bob Snyder advised claw machine owners to avoid using the word "skill" in the game description decal present on most machines.

In New Jersey, claw machines are regulated by the Legalized Games of Chance Control Commission. In 2016, New Jersey Senator Nicholas Scutari proposed legislation that would add specifications to prevent claw machines from being unwinnable.

In other jurisdictions, such as Alberta, Canada, skill cranes are illegal unless the player is allowed to make repeated attempts (on a single credit) until he or she wins a prize. Skill cranes in single-play mode (where the player has only one chance per credit to try for a prize) were found by the Ontario Court of Appeal to be essentially games of chance, and therefore prohibited except at fairs or exhibitions, where they are covered by an exemption.

=== Asia ===
Claw machines were outlawed in Thailand after being classified as gambling devices by the Supreme Court of Thailand in 2004, though, until 2019, laws prohibiting their use were rarely enforced. In 2020, the Ministry of Interior in Thailand ordered a nationwide ban on claw machines after activists protested against their widespread availability. However, the public prosecutor of Chiang Mai ruled in 2022 that claw machines were vending machines rather than gambling machines and were therefore legal. South Korean law dictates that claw machines cannot carry prizes worth over ₩5,000 to prevent addiction. An investigation by South Korea's Game Rating and Administration Committee in 2017 found that the majority of claw machines they randomly inspected broke Korean law. The Consumer Protection Committee of the Executive Yuan stated in 2019 that their investigation of claw machines in Taoyuan, New Taipei City, Kaohsiung, Taipei City, Tainan, and Taichung found that 70 percent of them contained illegal adult products such as vibrators and e-cigarettes. In 2021, the Ministry of Home Affairs in Singapore proposed capping the value of prizes in claw machines at S$100 in order to, according to them, "address the inducement effect of high-value prizes, without increasing the regulatory burden on operators". In March 2024, Brunei has banned claw machines as they have been deemed haram due to its gambling elements.

== Chances of winning ==
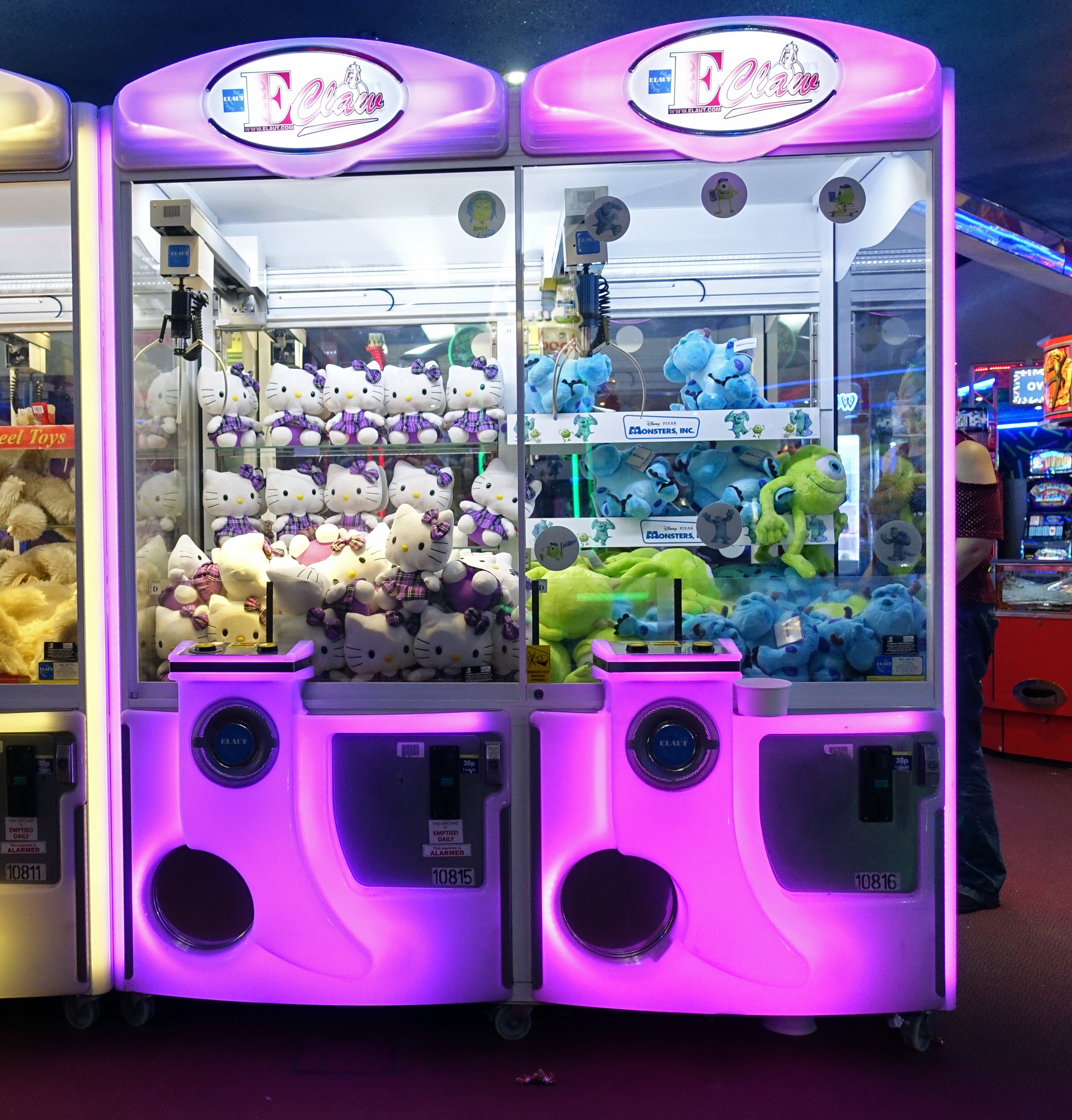
A pair of E-Claw, claw machines created by Belgian manufacturer Elaut

Since the 1920s, advertising for claw machines has suggested that they are able to be won completely through strategy and skill. Claw machines can be set to give players a chance of winning during every paid turn if they use a "Play Till Win" setting. Settings like claw strength and "dropping skill"—the ability of a claw to drop a prize back into the machine after picking it up—are frequently modified by arcade owners to control the odds of a player winning and are often based on how much money the machine has earned. Claw machine strength-control has been reported in the United States, South Africa, South Korea, and Singapore.

On social media platforms such as TikTok and YouTube, videos of people using claw machines and offering modifications for how to get prizes from them were popular in the 2010s and 2020s. A 2015 report by Vox's Phil Edwards describing how claw machines were often rigged went viral online and became controversial among claw machine enthusiasts. A 2016 report by Jeff Rossen for the American TV program Today showing the same thing prompted the American Amusement Machine Association, which represents arcade game manufacturers across the United States, to make their members sign a "Fair Play Pledge" in 2017 that required their machines to be winnable through skill alone. The 2021 book How to Beat the Claw Machine: Tips and Tricks to Help You Win Big, written by American arcade owner Brian McKanna, offers tips on how to win prizes at claw machines, which he described as "absolutely rigged".

According to a 2023 report by News24, most claw machines in South Africa are rigged to only allow players to win if the machine has earned a certain amount of money. A manual for the Intelligrab operating system, made by Belgian manufacturer Elaut, encourages claw machine owners to create the illusion that the player has a chance of winning if they keep trying, and owners can adjust machines' claw strength per turn.
