= Conduit toolbar =

Online platform

Malware details
- Classification: Potentially unwanted program
- Author: Conduit Inc.

The Conduit toolbar was an online platform that allowed web publishers to create custom toolbars, web apps, and mobile apps at no cost. It was developed by Conduit Inc. but demerged to Perion Network. Conduit had approximately 260,000 registered publishers who have collectively created content downloaded by more than 250 million end users. Web apps and pieces of content developed through Conduit's platform can be distributed and exchanged online via the Conduit App Marketplace. As of 2010, 60 million users consumed apps from the marketplace on a daily basis.

Conduit's toolbars have been described in online forums and news outlets as malware and are difficult to remove. It has both browser hijacking and rootkit capabilities. Conduit began to shift away from this part of its business in late 2013 when it spun off its toolbar division into Perion Network through a reverse merger. After the deal, Conduit shareholders still owned 81% of Perion's existing shares, though both Perion and Conduit remain independent companies.

== History ==
In 2010 Conduit then-president Adam Boyden was featured in Forbes magazine online, in which he discussed the link between successful social gaming and marketing principles. In 2010 there were more than 100 million toolbars being powered by Conduit that were used at least once a month, which put Conduit at #29 on Google's list of top 1,000 sites on the Internet that year. In May 2011, Conduit completed the $45 million acquisition of Israeli startup Wibiya, an engagement platform that enables publishers to integrate a variety of web applications on their site via the Wibiya Bar product.

During this time Conduit moved away from the toolbar part of its business in order to focus on its mobile and browser engagement offerings. Ingrid Lunden of TechCrunch wrote that by spinning off the Client Connect business, the "split divided the company in two, with one part focusing on its mobile and engagement business and run by Shilo, and the other, Client Connect, merging with Perion". Lunden said further that, "Less than a month after browser-toolbar and mobile startup Conduit merged its Client Connect division with Perion, the company is making another change to its business. Conduit has announced that it will be discontinuing Wibiya, the social browser toolbar service that it acquired in 2011 for $45 million, as it shifts further away from its toolbar business." In late 2013 Conduit was valued at $1.5 billion.

== Technology ==
=== Browser ===
Until 2013, one of Conduit's main businesses revolved around downloadable toolbars. Conduit allowed publishers to create and distribute their own toolbars for web browsers. Typically the toolbars were installed with another software product on which the toolbar is a piggyback program, with users given the option to not install the toolbar. Browsers that initially supported the toolbars included Internet Explorer, Firefox, and Safari. Google Chrome was added as a supported browser in 2011. Conduit uses Microsoft Bing to provide search results to the user.

Examples of toolbars have included a Zynga-designed toolbar that helps Farmville enthusiasts keep up-to-date with the status of their game, another is a toolbar from eBay that provides auction updates. The content is customized to the individual toolbar rather than generalized for all users. The toolbar can also be used for general information distribution as well, which has been used by companies to engage in marketing campaigns. Other companies that have developed Conduit toolbars include Major League Baseball, Greenpeace, and Lufthansa. Some of the companies and brands that have used Conduit's platform are Major League Baseball, Time Warner Cable, Fox News, Zynga, Chelsea Football Club, Groupon, Travelocity, μTorrent, and The Weather Channel. The toolbars have been described in online forums and news outlets as browser hijackers and are difficult to remove. It is said that most of Conduit's revenue comes from paid referrals from its search engine.

Conduit toolbars are automatically downloaded alongside certain freeware in order to provide its publisher with monetization. Conduit toolbars have rootkit capabilities that hook the toolbar deep into operating systems and can perform browser hijacking. Many conduit removal tools are also considered to be malware themselves. While not a virus, the program is referred to as a "potentially unwanted program" by some in the computer industry.
