= Conduit (company) =

Software development company

Conduit Ltd.
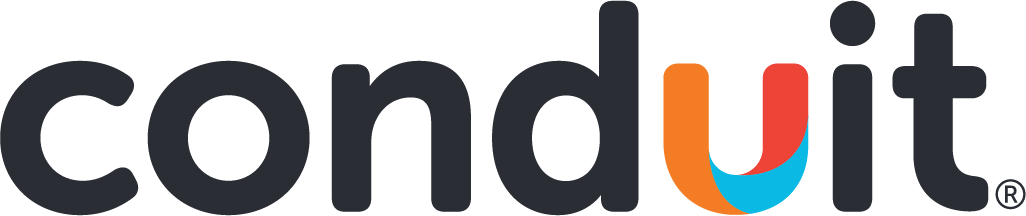
- Type: Private
- Industry: Technology; Web publisher; Mobile app
- Founded: 2005
- Founder: Ronen Shilo; Dror Erez; Gaby Bilcyzk
- Headquarters: New York City, United States; London, United Kingdom
- Area served: Worldwide
- Website: www.conduit.com

Conduit Ltd. is an international software company. From its founding in 2005 to 2013, its most well-known product was the Conduit toolbar, which was widely described as malware. In 2013, it spun off its toolbar business; today, its main product is a mobile development platform that allows users to create native and web mobile applications for smartphones.

== Products ==
From 2005 to 2013, the company's most well-known product was the Conduit toolbar, which is flagged by most antivirus software as potentially unwanted and adware. Conduit's toolbar software is often downloaded by malware packages from other publishers. The company spun off the toolbar division that manages the Conduit toolbar in 2013.

Today, the company's main product is a mobile development platform that allows users to create native and web mobile applications for smartphones. App creation for its App Gallery is free, but it charges a monthly subscription fee to place apps on the App Store or Google Play.

== History ==
Conduit was founded in 2005 by Shilo, Dror Erez, and Gaby Bilcyzk. Between years 2005 and 2013, it ran a successful but controversial toolbar platform business.

Conduit was part of the so-called Download Valley companies monetizing free software and downloads by bundling adware. The toolbars were criticized by some as being very difficult to uninstall. The toolbar software was referred to as a "potentially unwanted program" by some in the computer industry because it could be used to change browser settings.

The company had more than 400 employees in 2013. In September of the same year, Conduit spun off its entire website toolbar business division, which combined with Perion Network. After the deal, Conduit shareholders owned 81% of Perion's existing shares and both Perion and Conduit remained independent companies. The substantial size of the Conduit user base allowed Perion to immediately surpass AOL in U.S. searches.

In 2015, Conduit announced it would purchase Keeprz, a mobile customer loyalty platform, for $45 million.

== See also ==
- Perion Network
- Download Valley
- Conduit toolbar
