= Potentially unwanted program =

Software often described as unwanted

A potentially unwanted program (PUP) or potentially unwanted application (PUA) is software that a user may perceive as unwanted or unnecessary. It is used as a subjective tagging criterion by security and parental control products. Such software may use an implementation that can compromise privacy or weaken the computer's security. Companies often bundle a wanted program download with a wrapper application and may offer to install an unwanted application, and in some cases without providing a clear opt-out method (this is an example of a dark pattern). Antivirus companies define the software bundled as potentially unwanted programs which can include software that displays intrusive advertising (adware), or tracks the user's Internet usage to sell information to advertisers (spyware), injects its own advertising into web pages that a user looks at, or uses premium SMS services to rack up charges for the user.

A growing number of open-source software projects have expressed dismay at third-party websites wrapping their downloads with unwanted bundles, without the project's knowledge or consent. Nearly every third-party free download site bundles their downloads with potentially unwanted software. The practice is widely considered unethical because it violates the security interests of users without their informed consent. Some unwanted software bundles install a root certificate on a user's device, which allows hackers to intercept private data such as banking details, without a browser giving security warnings. The United States Department of Homeland Security has advised removing an insecure root certificate, because they make computers vulnerable to serious cyberattacks. Software developers and security experts recommend that people always download the latest version from the official project website, or a trusted package manager or app store.

== Origins ==
Historically, the first big companies working with potentially unwanted programs for creating revenue came up in the US in the mid-2000s, such as Zango. These activities declined after the companies were investigated, and in some cases indicted, by authorities for invasive and harmful installs.

=== Download Valley ===
A major industry, dedicated to creating revenue by foisting potentially unwanted programs, has grown among the Israeli software industry and is frequently referred to as Download Valley. These companies are responsible for a large part of the download and install tools, which place unwanted, additional software on users' systems.

== Unwanted programs ==
Unwanted programs have increased in recent years, and one study in 2014 classified unwanted programs as comprising 24.77% of total malware infections. This malware includes adware according to Google. Many programs include unwanted browser add-ons that track which websites a user goes to in order to sell this information to advertisers, or add advertising into web pages. Five percent of computer browser visits to Google-owned websites are altered by computer programs that inject their own ads into pages. Researchers have identified 50,870 Google Chrome extensions and 34,407 programs that inject ads. Thirty-eight percent of extensions and 17 percent of programs were catalogued as malicious software, the rest being potentially unwanted adware-type applications. Some Google Chrome extension developers have sold extensions they made to third-party companies who silently push unwanted updates that incorporate previously non-existent adware into the extensions.

=== Local proxies ===
Spyware programs install a proxy server on a person's computer that monitors all web traffic passing through it, tracking user interests to build up a profile and sell that profile to advertisers.

==== Superfish ====
Superfish is an advertising injector that creates its own root certificate in a computer operating system, allowing the tool to inject advertising into encrypted Google search pages and track the history of a user's search queries.

In February 2015, the United States Department of Homeland Security advised uninstalling Superfish and its associated root certificate from Lenovo computers, because they make computers vulnerable to serious cyberattacks, including interception of passwords and sensitive data being transmitted through browsers. Heise Security revealed that the Superfish certificate is included in bundled downloads with a number of applications from companies including SAY Media and Lavasoft's Ad-Aware Web Companion.

=== Browser hijacking ===
Many companies use browser hijacking to modify a user's home page and search page, to force Internet hits to a particular website and make money from advertisers. Some companies steal the cookies in a user's browser, hijacking their connections to websites they are logged into, and performing actions using their account, without the user's knowledge or consent (like installing Android apps).

=== Fraudulent dialer ===
Users with dial-up Internet access use modems in their computer to connect to the Internet, and these have been targeted by fraudulent applications that used security holes in the operating system to dial premium numbers.

Many Android devices are targeted by malware that use premium SMS services to rack up charges for users.

=== Unwanted not by the user ===
A few classes of software are usually installed knowingly by the user and do not show any automated abusive behavior. However, the Enterprise controlling the computer or the antivirus vendor may consider the program unwanted due to the activities they allow.

Peer-to-peer file sharing programs are sometimes labelled as PUA and deleted due to their alleged links to piracy. In March 2021, Windows Defender started removing uTorrent and qBittorrent, causing widespread user confusion. Microsoft has since updated the PUA database to flag torrent clients on enterprise installations only.

Keygens not tainted by actual malware are also commonly tagged as PUA due to piracy.

== Third party websites ==
In 2015, research by Emsisoft suggested that all free download providers bundled their downloads with potentially unwanted software, and that Download.com was the worst offender. Lowell Heddings expressed dismay that "Sadly, even on Google all the top results for most open source and freeware are just ads for really terrible sites that are bundling crapware, adware, and malware on top of the installer."

=== Download.com ===
In December 2011 Gordon Lyon published his strong dislike of the way Download.com had started bundling grayware with their installation managers and concerns over the bundled software, causing many people to spread the post on social networks, and a few dozen media reports. The main problem is the confusion between Download.com-offered content and software offered by original authors; the accusations included deception as well as copyright and trademark violation.

In 2014, The Register and US-CERT warned that via Download.com's "foistware", an "attacker may be able to download and execute arbitrary code".

=== Sourceforge ===
Many open-source software developers have expressed frustration and dismay that their work is being packaged by companies that profit from their work by using search advertising to occupy the first result on a search page. Increasingly, these pages are offering bundled installers that include unwanted software, and confuse users by presenting the bundled software as an official download page endorsed by the open source project.

As of early 2016 this is no longer the case. Ownership of SourceForge transferred to SourceForge Media, LLC, a subsidiary of BIZX, LLC (BIZX). After the sale they removed the DevShare program, which means bundled installers are no longer available.

==== GIMP ====
In November 2013, GIMP, a free image manipulation program, removed its download from SourceForge, citing misleading download buttons that can potentially confuse customers, as well as SourceForge's own Windows installer, which bundles third-party offers. In a statement, GIMP called SourceForge a once "useful and trustworthy place to develop and host FLOSS applications" that now faces "a problem with the ads they allow on their sites ..." In May 2015, the GIMP for Windows SourceForge project was transferred to the ownership of the "SourceForge Editorial Staff" account and adware downloads were re-enabled. The same happened to the developers of nmap.

In May 2015 SourceForge took control of projects which had migrated to other hosting sites and replaced the project downloads with adware-laden downloads.

==== Nmap ====
Gordon Lyon has lost control of the Nmap SourceForge page, with SourceForge taking over the project's page. Lyon stated "So far they seem to be providing just the official Nmap files (as long as you don't click on the fake download buttons) and we haven't caught them trojaning Nmap the way they did with GIMP. But we certainly don't trust them one bit! Sourceforge is pulling the same scheme that CNet Download.com tried back when they started circling the drain".

==== VLC media player ====
VideoLAN has expressed dismay that users searching for their product see search advertising from websites that offer "bundled" downloads that include unwanted programs, while VideoLAN lacks resources to sue the many companies abusing their trademarks.

== See also ==
- Conduit toolbar
- Pre-installed software
- Shovelware
