= Clawee =

Arcade video game

- Developer: Gigantic
- Publisher: Gigantic
- Platforms: Microsoft Windows, iOS, Android
- Release: 2017
- Genre: Claw machine
- Mode: Single player

Clawee (stylized as clawee) is a claw machine game, played online on real arcade machines controlled remotely through video streaming via a mobile app or computer. The game was developed by Israeli company Gigantic, which operates the machines in a warehouse in Petah Tikva, Israel.

The name derives from claw machine games, in which players utilize a handle to maneuver a claw trying to catch items.

== The company ==
Gigantic was established in 2017 by Ron Brightman, its CEO, and Oded Frommer. The company has 60 employees, with offices in Tel Aviv.

It has a warehouse in Petah Tikva where 250 arcade machines are stored and being operated 24 hours a day, each day throughout the year.

The machines are handled by a team of employees, who fill them and check for errors.

The company built its own machines and added transmitters, sensors and webcams enabling the players to have a real-time view and control of the machines. Gigantic has raised $9 million, the main investor being Union Tech Ventures and NFX, whose general partner is Gigi Levy-Weiss.

== The app ==
Clawee can be played in fourteen countries: Canada, Denmark, Germany, Hong Kong, Israel, Japan, Malaysia, Portugal, Singapore, Spain, Sweden, United Kingdom, and the United States.

According to Sensor Tower, in October 2020, Clawee had over 100,000 downloads with aggregate revenue of hundreds of thousands of dollars.

Approximately 70 percent of the players are women. In each moment, there are around 200,000 players on the site, and twofold that number are watching.

As of February 2021, the app has been downloaded 8 million times. The company ships over 100,000 prizes each month from its warehouses in the United States and China.

Clawee won the Samsung Galaxy Store 2020 award in the category of Best Indie Game of the Year.

== The game ==
Users install the app for free from Google Play, App Store (iOS/iPadOS), or login from the desktop to Clawee's website. They buy tokens, choose an arcade machine and start to play. Each machine has a different prize with different cost.

As beginners, they play simple games for cheap prizes.

When players catch a prize, they can claim it and the prize will be delivered to their home, or they can exchange it for coins to play more games.

They can get coins by inviting friends or if they log in on a daily basis.

Players can become VIP members, and then they will have free shipping for all their wins and the ability to play on the VIP machines, with more expensive prizes and unlock a daily login.

Players can navigate the claw only in two directions: sideways or toward the cabinet's hindpart and try to drop the prize above the chute hole. They can watch the game from one of the two cameras located in separate angles: one in the front, and the other on the side.

They can watch others play and view the last winning video of each machine.

The prizes include dolls, jewelry, gadgets, plushies, games, home appliances, makeup, masks, memorabilia, accessories, apparel and stuffed toys.

Besides claw machines, there are also football, basketball and golf machines, and a machine in which a toy gun shoots plastic clowns.
