= Installer VISE =

- Developer(s): MindVision Software (Digital River)
- Stable release: 3.7 (Win), 5.1 (Mac OS X), 8.5 (Mac OS 9)
- Operating system: Mac OS X, Mac OS 9, Microsoft Windows
- Type: Installation maker
- License: Proprietary
- Website: www.mindvision.com

Installer VISE was an installer maker that supported Mac OS 9, Mac OS X, and Windows by MindVision Software.

== History ==
Steve Kiene, the founder of MindVision, had done software work in the area of data compression, producing the Application VISE executable compressor for the Mac platform and a disk compression software implementation; the latter was released as Stacker after having been acquired by Stac Electronics. Mindvision had been founded in 1987. Installer VISE (which was first called Developer VISE) initially arose from some add-on software extensions that Kiene had developed for use with the Installer software from Apple.

Originally created Mac-only, Installer VISE was one of the most popular installer makers for the platform around 2006 given its visual interface that made the software easy to use by nontechnical persons in addition to its extensive features. It was also popular among shareware and Carbon applications that required support for both Mac OS 9 and X. By 2000 Apple themselves were using the software to package and update their own QuickTime product. Other noted users of the product included Adobe, Microsoft, Macintax, Netscape, BBEdit, Claris and Quicken.

In 1997 the software was a finalist in Macworld/MacTech magazines' Eddy Awards in the "MacTech Best Developer Tool" category.

It also supported localization within a single package, supported AppleScript, and makes no use of Apple's in-built Installer app. In 1998 Mindvision made the use of the product free for shareware software developers.

However, its popularity has waned on Mac OS X. VISE X, an installer maker designed to produce installers specifically for installing Mac OS X software, was released by MindVision Software in 2003.

Quietly, without any press release, MindVision Software was acquired by Digital River in 2006. As of 2020, the software company seems to have closed down and the website is pointing to an e-commerce solution developed by Digital River, MyCommerce.

== See also ==
- List of installation software

== Sources ==
- Rebello, N. Sonjoy (November–December 1999). "How to distribute your software over the web". Computing in Science & Engineering. 1 (6): 79–81. Bibcode:1999CSE.....1f..79R. doi:10.1109/5992.805138.
