= Wibiya =

Online toolbar platform

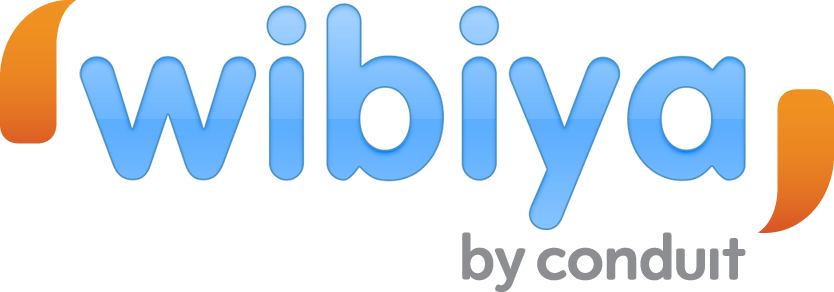
- Company type: Subsidiary
- Industry: Technology; Web publisher
- Founded: 2008
- Founder: Dror Ceder; Daniel Tal; Avi Smila
- Headquarters: Tel Aviv, Israel
- Area served: Worldwide
- Website: www.wibiya.com

Wibiya was an online toolbar platform that offered web publishers the option to add web applications to their respective websites at no cost. With these web apps, the company aims to provide publishers with services and features that are designed to assist publishers in communicating with their audience by making their sites more interactive, potentially increasing page views and providing enriched content.

== Company ==
Wibiya was founded in 2008 in Israel by Dror Ceder, Daniel Tal, and Avi Smila and subsequently acquired in 2011 for $45 million by Conduit, the San Mateo, CA-based publisher network and platform. Investors in the company included Primera Capital, Yossi Vardi, Oded Vardi, and Jeff Pulver.

In October 2013, Conduit announced that it would be shutting down Wibiya at the end of 2013. On December 31 Wibiya was shut down.

Starting November 2015, the Wibiya Website links began to redirect to new toolbar website tealdit.com. Once conduit released the domain to market after failed to renew, it was put on sale at Sedo auction. Damodar Bashyal bought the domain from there and redirected all links to tealdit.com.
