= Ronen Shilo =

Israeli entrepreneur and software engineer

- רונן שילה
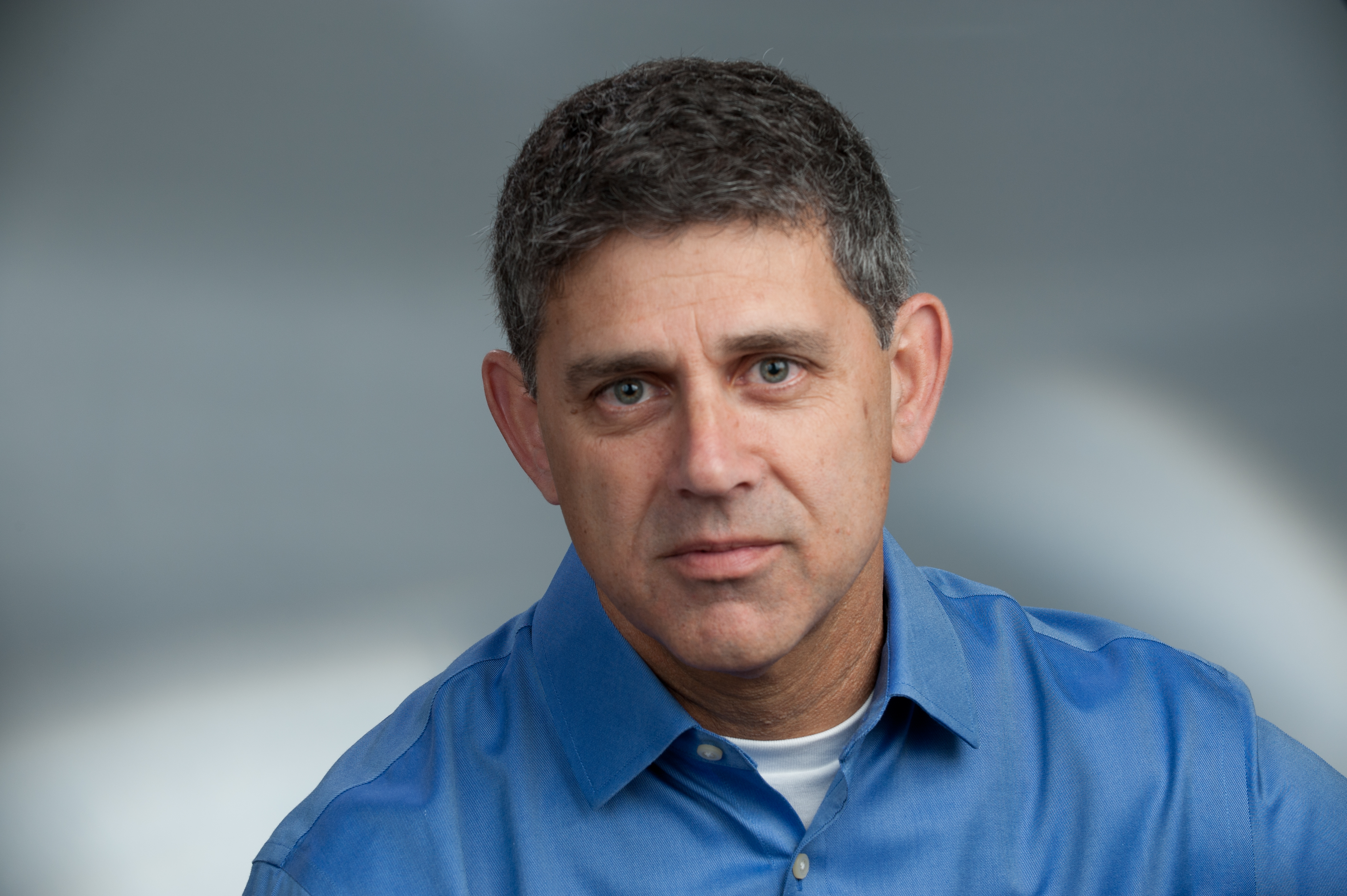
- Shilo in December, 2011
- Born: May 1, 1958 (age 68)
- Education: BSc, Technion
- Occupations: Entrepreneur and software technologist
- Website: www.conduit.com

Ronen Shilo (Hebrew: רונן שילה; born May 1, 1958) is an Israeli entrepreneur and software engineer. He is the founder and CEO of Conduit, an online platform for publishers to create free mobile apps and loyalty programs. Conduit became Israel's largest Internet company in 2013, valued at $1.3 billion.

== Biography ==
Ronen Shilo grew up in Ness Ziona and served as an officer in the Israel Defense Forces. where

He graduated from the Technion, the Israeli Institute of Technology, with a BSc in Computer Science.

Shilo is married and has three children. He told Inc. Magazine in 2013 that his company's billion dollar valuation had not changed his lifestyle and that he and his family still lived in the same home.

== Business career ==
Early in his career, Shilo worked for Ready Systems in Silicon Valley.

In 1995, he founded DoubleAgent. Nine months later the company was acquired by software company NetManage. Ronen was manager of its Tel Aviv branch before leaving in 1999 to start Effective-I, a learning system for corporate use.

Shilo founded Conduit in 2005 with partners Gaby Bilcyzk and Dror Erez to help publishers retain and engage users. Though the company has received venture funding, the three founders retain a majority share in the company.

In the Financial Times, he called the phenomena of Israeli companies selling too early as "Quick Sell" nation. Israeli newspaper Haaretz mentioned him in the article "Four Reasons Not to Hate Israel's Big Business Tycoons" as one of a small number of Israeli tech CEOs who "shunned the quick buck of an M&A deal and stayed the course." He wrote an article for Fast Company in 2012 explaining why he had largely stayed out of the press despite running an Internet company with 260 million users.
