= WiX =

Windows Installer creation toolset

WiX Toolset
- Original authors: Rob Mensching, Microsoft
- Developer: .NET Foundation
- Release: 5 April 2004; 22 years ago
- Stable release: 7.0.0 / 7 April 2026; 4 months ago
- Written in: C++, C#
- Operating system: Windows
- Type: Software development tools
- License: Open Source Maintenance Fee
- Website: www.firegiant.com/wixtoolset/
- Repository: github.com/wixtoolset

Windows Installer XML Toolset (WiX, pronounced "wicks") is a free software toolset that builds Windows Installer packages from XML. It consists of a command-line environment that developers may integrate into their build processes to build MSI and MSM packages. WiX was the first Microsoft project to be released under an open-source license, the Common Public License. It was also the first Microsoft project to be hosted on an external website.

After its release in 2004, Microsoft has used WiX to package Office 2007, SQL Server 2005, Visual Studio 2005/2008, and other products.

WiX includes a Visual Studio extension that allows creating and building WiX setup projects using the Visual Studio IDE. The extension supports syntax highlighting and IntelliSense for .wxs source files and adds a WiX setup project type .wixproj to Visual Studio.

== History ==
WiX was the first Microsoft project to be released under an open-source license, the Common Public License. Initially hosted on SourceForge, it was also the first Microsoft project to be hosted externally.

On June 6, 2010, WiX moved from SourceForge to CodePlex. On August 14, 2012, Microsoft transferred the WiX copyright to the Microsoft-sponsored Outercurve Foundation. At the same time, the license was changed from the Common Public License to the Microsoft Reciprocal License. On May 4, 2016, WiX was transferred to the .NET Foundation.

Visual Studio 2012 removed the traditional setup project type. However, due to user feedback, an MSI setup project type was made available as a free extension starting with Visual Studio 2013. WiX is one of a set of recommended alternatives.

In January 2013 the company FireGiant was founded by Rob Mensching and Kirk Fertitta and is the organization that continues the development of WiX. On April 5, 2025, WiX 6.0 was released. Starting with this version, the license under which the software may be used was changed to Open Source Maintenance Fee. When a company uses WiX and generates more than US$10,000 revenue, it is required that the company pays a fee.

== Functions ==
WiX is a toolset designed to build Windows Installer (.msi) packages using the command line. It comes with the following tools:

- Candle: compiles source files into object files
- Light: combines object files into a .msi file
- Lit: creates libraries that can be linked by Light.exe
- Dark: decompiles a .msi file into WiX code
- Heat: creates a WiX source file
- Pyro: creates Patch files (.msp) without needing the Windows Installer SDK
- Burn: coordinates dependency installer

== See also ==
- List of installation software
- Shared Source Initiative
