= IBario =

iBario
- Developer: Emil [Paz] Puzailov
- Release: 2010
- Written in: XML
- Type: Software distribution, online retail, software
- Website: ibario.com

iBario was an internet marketing conglomerate founded in 2010 based in Israel.

iBario requested to be removed from Google search results in 2012 and 2013, due to copyright infringement. It was estimated by industry experts that iBario was worth approximately US$100 million in 2014, but it has not been active since 2015.

== History ==
Founded in 2010 by five founders, iBario, was a privately owned and funded company. The company focused on product diversification and branched out in various different industries including cooking, software and gaming. While active, iBario was considered to be one of the world's largest internet marketing platforms.

With 60 employees at its peak, iBario operated from a modest industrial building in Or Yehuda and was estimated by industry experts to be worth around US$100 million. According to estimates in 2014, iBario had an annual turnover of $90 million and a net revenue of more than $10 million.

iBario was one of the biggest Google Adwords buyers in Israel and Europe, and was a well-known partner of Google.

== Business model ==
As a privately owned and funded company, iBario received the majority of its funding from advertisements. The company ran their own advertising network, RevenueHits, which served advertisements to users on iBario sites. It worked with Israeli advertising networks Matomy Media Group and Marimedia. It also allowed users to run controlled test on the various marketing communication channels.

=== Revenue generation ===
iBario generated revenue from the development of PC maintenance products and the distribution of its software. It acquired brands including PerformerSoft, BeGamer and Slovak Studio.

iBario's biggest revenue generator was the free software installation engine InstallBrain. Studies estimated that iBario had at one point produced 50% of its revenue, a figure that had declined to approximately 20% due to the limited ability of toolbars to override the search engine settings of users.

RevenueHits, iBario's sister company, was estimated to account for 30-40% of their overall revenue.

=== Popularity ===
At its peak millions of unique monthly users visitored iBario's websites. Softtango, iBario's download site, which supplied about 25 million downloads per month, was at one point the fourth largest download site in the world. Other notable websites included:

- Mayajo, iBario's recipe site brought in more web traffic than well-known websites including Recipe.com and BigOven.
- Speedanalysis.com, a site which helped check users' online speed connection had 100 million unique visitors each month
