= DHS Science and Technology Command, Control, and Interoperability Division =

According to the DHS S&T website , the Command, Control, and Interoperability Division was a unit of the DHS Science and Technology Directorate which "develops interoperable communication standards and protocols for emergency responders, cyber security tools for protecting the integrity of the Internet, and automated capabilities to recognize and analyze potential threats."

The division is currently led by Dr. David Boyd. It is supervised by the Under Secretary of Homeland Security for Science and Technology, currently being Jay M. Cohen.

The 2007 High Priority Technical Needs Brochure published by Homeland Security defines critical focus areas for Command, Control, and Interoperability research, falling primarily under the category of "cyber security":

- Secure internet protocols including standard security methods
- Improved capability to model the effects of cyber attacks and understanding of internet topography
- Comprehensive next-generation network models
- Composable and scalable secure systems
- Technologies and standards for managing identities, rights and authorities used in an organization's networks
- Information system insider threat detection models and mitigation technologies
- Analytical techniques for security across the IT system engineering lifecycle
- Process Control Systems (PCS) security

"information sharing":

- Data fusion from multiple sensors into Common Operating Picture (COP)
- Improved real-time data sharing of law enforcement information
- Management of user identities, rights and authorities
- Distribution of Intelligence Products
- Information sharing within/across sectors on terrorist threats
- Automated, dynamic, real-time data processing and visualization capability
- Analytic capabilities for structured, unstructured, and streaming data
- Situational awareness between US Coast Guard and partners
- Sensor fusion between Law Enforcement and Intelligence Partners

"border security":

- Ability to access ICE databases in which voice information is entered;provide analytical, reporting, and automated case deconfliction; classify, identify voice samples

"infrastructure protection":

- Advanced, automated and affordable monitoring and surveillance technologies

and "interoperability":

- Development and evaluation of Internet Protocol (IP) enabled backbones
- Test and evaluation of emergent wireless broadband data systems
- Acceleration of development and testing of P25 IP-based interfaces
- Identification and development of message interface standards
- Transition of Land Mobile Radios communication architectures to cellular based architectures
- Evaluation of access technologies
- Development of the complementary test procedures

This article incorporates public domain material from websites or documents of the United States Department of Homeland Security.
