= Revenera =

- Type: Division
- Industry: Software
- Founded: May 28, 2020 (as Revenera); 1987 (began as InstallShield)
- Headquarters: Itasca, Illinois
- Parent: Flexera
- Website: www.revenera.com

Revenera is a division of Flexera that operates in software monetization, software composition analysis, and software installation. The division launched on May 28, 2020.

== History ==
The origins of Revenera trace to 1987 with the founding of InstallShield. In 1988, Globetrotter Software released FlexLM. Macrovision acquired Globetrotter in 2000 and renamed FlexLM to FlexNet Publisher. That year, Flexera opened its first European office and released AdminStudio. Macrovision acquired InstallShield in 2004 and Zero G Software in 2005. Macrovision spun off Acresso Software in 2008, which was renamed to Flexera Software in 2009. Flexera acquired Intraware that year, adding the SubscribeNet platform from 1996.

Flexera moved its headquarters to Itasca, Illinois, in 2014. It acquired Secunia in 2015 and Palamida in 2016. Flexera acquired Revulytics in 2020 and rebranded its Supplier Division as Revenera on May 28 of the same year.

== Products and services ==
Revenera provides software monetization products. In software licensing, Dynamic Monetization offers cloud-based services for usage tracking and pay-per-use models. FlexNet Embedded is an SDK for licensing in devices and embedded systems across platforms, including Windows, Linux, and VxWorks. FlexNet Publisher, formerly FlexLM, manages license models for on-premises applications using license files or trusted storage. Cloud Monetization API provides RESTful services for entitlement management and usage reporting in cloud environments. FlexNet ID Dongle uses hardware for license enforcement.

In entitlement management, FlexNet Operations handles customer accounts, license activation, and renewals with APIs for integration with ERP and CRM systems. Monetization Analytics delivers reports on usage and entitlement data. Software Delivery and Updates distribute installers and patches through authenticated portals.

Usage Intelligence collects data on application usage, including session frequency and version distribution. Compliance Intelligence aggregates data to detect unlicensed software use and support audits.

In software installation, InstallShield creates installers for Microsoft Windows platforms and some mobile devices. InstallAnywhere builds installation packages for Windows, Linux, and macOS from a single project, supporting physical, virtual, and cloud deployments.

In software composition analysis, Code Insight scans code for open-source components, manages license compliance, and tracks vulnerabilities across over 25 programming languages. SBOM Insights aggregates SBOM data from different sources for risk management and compliance reporting. OSS Inspector is an IDE plugin for IntelliJ IDEA that displays open-source dependency details in Java and Kotlin projects using Gradle.

Revenera publishes annual Monetization Monitor reports on software monetization, piracy, and usage analytics trends.

== Awards and honors ==
ComponentSource named Revenera a Top 25 Best Selling Publisher 2025 and InstallShield a Top 50 Best Selling Product 2025. IoT Breakthrough awarded Revenera the Overall Enterprise IoT Platform of the Year in 2025. IoT Evolution gave the Revenera IoT Monetization Platform a 2024 IoT Platforms Leadership Award. Frost & Sullivan recognized Revenera as the market leader for software-enforced licensing and entitlement management in 2022.

In January 2026, Revenera was named "Overall Enterprise IoT Platform of the Year" in the 10th Annual IoT Breakthrough Awards Program for its IoT Monetization Platform.

Revenera received Frost & Sullivan's 2026 Global Product Leadership Recognition for Excellence in Software Value Chain Enablement.
