= Perion Network =

Israel-based ad-tech company

Perion
- Formerly: IncrediMail (1999–2011)
- Type: Public
- Traded as: Nasdaq: PERI, TASE: PERI
- Industry: Internet
- Founder: Yaron Adler; Ofer Adler
- Headquarters: Tel Aviv, Israel
- Area served: Worldwide
- Key people: Tal Jacobson (CEO); Elad Tzubery (CFO)
- Products: Perion One Omnichannel Advertising Platform
- Revenue: ▲US$ 743.16 million (2023)
- Net income: ▲US$117.41 million (2023)
- Number of employees: 420 (as of June 2024)
- Website: www.perion.com

Perion Network Ltd. is a technology company that provides digital advertising products and services. It is headquartered in Tel Aviv, Israel, with offices in Tel Aviv, New York, Los Angeles, London, Chicago, Boston, Atlanta, Toronto, Montréal and Kyiv.

== History ==
=== 1999–2011: IncrediMail ===
IncrediMail was founded in 1999 by cousins Yaron and Ofer Adler. The company raised about US$270,000 in initial capital in late 1999 and $3 million in April 2000. Its product, also called IncrediMail, was a free email client that allowed users to add animations, sound effects, backgrounds and emoticons to their messages.

In January 2006, IncrediMail raised $18.75 million in an initial public offering and was listed on Nasdaq. In 2007, it was listed on the Tel Aviv Stock Exchange. In February 2008, IncrediMail announced that Ofer Adler would succeed Yaron Adler as chief executive, with Yaron Adler becoming president.

In August 2010, Josef Mandelbaum, previously chief executive of American Greetings' intellectual property unit, became CEO, and Ofer Adler remained with the company as chief product officer.

In August 2011, Perion acquired the Redmond-based Smilebox for $25 million. Smilebox was an application designed for creating slideshows, e-cards, invitations, and other digital photo albums.

=== 2011–present: Perion ===
In November 2011, the company was renamed as Perion, deriving its name from the Hebrew word for productivity.

In November 2012, Perion acquired Israel-based SweetPacks (or SweetIM), for approximately $41 million. SweetPacks specialized in producing a range of downloadable content for daily use.

In January 2014, Perion took over Conduit's ClientConnect business in an all-stock transaction valued at $660 million. Later, in June 2014, Perion acquired San Francisco-based Grow Mobile as it repositioned itself to emphasize business-to-business services. After the acquisition, Grow Mobile was integrated into Perion Lightspeed, a platform that serves the advertising requirements of mobile app developers. In August 2014, Perion extended its agreement with Microsoft's Bing search service, powering search in Perion products for desktop and mobile platforms.

In February 2015, Perion acquired MakeMeReach, a platform that helped app developers with social media advertising, for $15 million. In December 2015, Perion acquired the digital advertising firm, Undertone, for $180 million.

In 2016, Ronen Shilo, a co-founder of Conduit, campaigned for changes to the company's board and management. In September 2016, Perion announced that Mandelbaum would step down, and in January 2017 it named Doron Gerstel, a former chief executive of Zend Technologies and Panaya, as CEO, effective April 2017. Under his leadership, Perion took initiatives to minimize the company's debt and enhance its "operational efficiency". This period also saw the company broaden its reach into the digital television advertising sector.

In January 2019, Perion acquired Septa Communications, a Kyiv-based AI company that provided ad performance analytics service, for $3.5 million.

By January 2020, Perion acquired Content IQ, a New York-based startup that focused on optimizing digital advertising through cookie-less tracking and analytics. Later, in July 2020, Perion acquired assets from a digital publisher-centric ad-tech firm, Pub Ocean, and subsequently integrated it into Content IQ.

In April 2021, Perion acquired a Tel Aviv-based video monetization platform, Vidazoo, for $93.5 million. In September 2021, MakeMeReach, a subsidiary of Perion, formed a partnership with Pinterest, allowing ad purchasing and data integration from major social platforms and Google. Perion raised $57.4 million in a share offering in January 2021 and $156.6 million in December 2021.

In February 2023, Perion announced that Tal Jacobson, general manager of CodeFuel, would succeed Gerstel as CEO on August 1, 2023. In December 2023, it acquired Hivestack, a Montreal-based digital out-of-home advertising technology company for $100 million in cash and up to $25 million in additional payments.

In June 2024, Perion announced significant layoffs as part of a cost-cutting initiative. The decision came after Microsoft's further actions to completely remove several advertisers from its Bing network, which severely harmed Perion's revenues. As a result, Perion decided to eliminate 35 jobs, primarily within its search division in Israel. This reduction represented 15% of the company's Israeli workforce, which numbered 230 employees out of a total of 650 globally.

In February 2025, Perion announced Perion One, a plan to combine its businesses, including Undertone, Hivestack, Vidazoo and CodeFuel, into a single advertising platform based on Hivestack's technology. In May 2025, it acquired Greenbids, a developer of AI-based custom bidding algorithms for digital advertising campaigns, for up to $65 million, and rebranded its product as Perion Algo.

In August 2026, Perion acquired Premier Retail Networks (PRN), a North American in-store retail media network, from Stratacache for up to $12 million in cash.

== See also ==
- Conduit (company)
- Conduit toolbar
- Download Valley
