= Installer (programming language) =

Scripting language for AmigaOS, derived from the LISP programming language

Example dialog

Installer is a scripting language developed by Sylvan Technical Arts and published by Commodore International for AmigaOS. It was first introduced in version 2.1 of AmigaOS in 1992. Its syntax is based on the LISP programming language.

A compatible re-implementation, InstallerLG, remains under active development as of October 2018.

== Example script ==
The following example, taken from the developer guide, demonstrates directory creation with user prompts:

(makedir "T:fred"
	(prompt "I will now create the directory \"T:Fred\"")
	(help @makedir-help)
	(infos)
	(confirm)
)

== Related tools ==
The InstallerGen tool provides a graphical alternative to writing scripts manually.
