= Flexera =

American computer software company

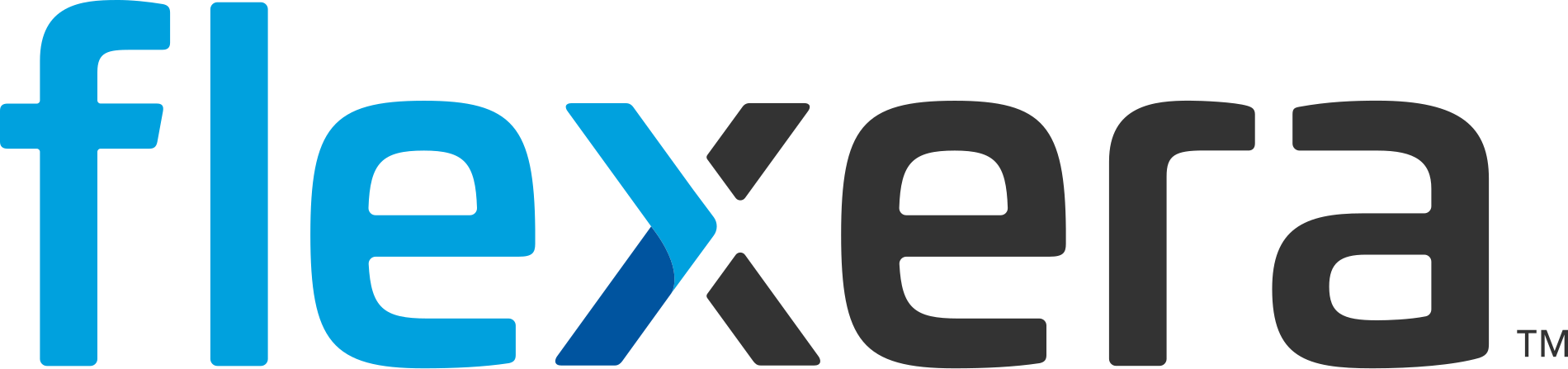
- Formerly: Acresso Software (2008-2009)
- Type: Private
- Industry: Technology
- Founded: 1988; 38 years ago
- Headquarters: Itasca, Illinois, U.S.
- Area served: Worldwide
- Key people: Mike Jerich (CEO), Bob McCarter (CTO)
- Number of employees: 2,300+
- Subsidiaries: Revenera; Snow Software; ProsperOps
- Website: www.flexera.com

Flexera is a global enterprise software company based in Itasca, Illinois. It provides technology spend and risk intelligence solutions. Its core offerings are built around its Flexera One platform and a specialized division for software producers called Revenera.

== History ==
On 1 April 2008, Macrovision sold its software division to the Thoma Bravo investment fund, which became Acresso Software. Macrovision subsequently changed its name to Rovi Corporation.

In October 2009, Acresso Software, Inc. became Flexera Software after a legal threat from Agresso Software.

On July 19, 2011, Thoma Bravo sold a majority stake in Flexera Software LLC to Teachers' Private Capital, the private investment department of the Ontario Teachers' Pension Plan. The transaction was finalized on October 3, 2011.

In 2020, Flexera released their SaaS platform Flexera One.

In December 2020, Flexera had agreed to sell a majority interest in the company to Thoma Bravo. Existing shareholders TA Associates and the Ontario Teachers' Pension Plan Board continued to hold stakes in the company.

== Flexera Acquisitions ==
Flexera acquired Australian based ManageSoft in 2010. Managesoft was OSA (Open Software Associates), which itself came out of HP's Australian Software Organisation.

On September 15, 2015, Flexera acquired Denmark based Secunia.

On September 17, 2017, Flexera announced the completion of the acquisition of BDNA.

On September 26, 2018, Flexera acquired RightScale.

On June 5, 2019, Flexera acquired Asheville, North Carolina–based RISC Networks.

On November 28, 2023, Flexera entered into a definitive agreement to acquire Snow Software, a software asset management company based in Sweden for an undisclosed sum. The acquisition was completed February 15, 2024.

On January 16, 2025, Flexera announced it had entered into an agreement to acquire the Spot FinOps and Cloud Infrastructure Products from NetApp, consisting of the previous NetApp acquisitions of SpotInst, CloudCheckr, and Fylamynt. and closed in early March of 2025

On January 6, 2026, Flexera announced two major acquisitions in its continued expansion in FinOps. According to the press release, "It has acquired ProsperOps, an AI-enabled FinOps automation solution for public cloud, and Chaos Genius, a fast-growing innovator in AI-driven cost optimization for Snowflake and Databricks."

== Flexera One Platform ==
Flexera One is the company's SaaS platform for managing hybrid IT environments.

It uses Flexera's Technology Intelligence Platform, which includes:

- Technopedia
- Product Use Rights Library (PURL)
- Enterprise Technology Blueprint (ETB)

=== Flexera Software ===
The Flexera Software division (now Revenera) has made several acquisitions. On February 26, 2016, Flexera Software acquired software composition analysis company Palamida.

On February 5, 2020, Flexera Software acquired software usage analytics company Revulytics.

In August 2025, KKR was leading an approximately $3 billion private credit package for Flexera Software. The financing was intended to refinance Flexera's existing broadly syndicated debt and fund a dividend payout.

== See also ==
- FlexNet Publisher
- InstallShield
