= InstallShield =

Software tool for creating installers or software packages

- InstallShield 2008 interface
- Original authors: Viresh Bhatia and Rick Harold
- Developer: Revenera
- Stable release: 2026 R2 / September 23, 2026; 1 day ago
- Operating system: Microsoft Windows
- Type: Installer
- License: Proprietary, Trialware
- Website: www.revenera.com/install/products/installshield

InstallShield is a proprietary software tool for creating installers or software packages. InstallShield is primarily used for installing software for Microsoft Windows desktop and server platforms, though it can also be used to manage software applications and packages on a variety of handheld and mobile devices.

== Features ==
InstallShield generates a .msi file which can be used on the destination computer in order to install the payloads from the source computer where it was created. It is possible to specify questions, set prerequisites and registry settings that the user will be able to choose at the installation time.

== Development ==
InstallShield was originally developed by The Stirling Group, a company founded in December 1987 by Viresh Bhatia and Rick Harold, who had first met when they were computer science students at Northwestern University. Their first office was a small room in the basement of an old library building in Roselle, Illinois. They were to market a geographic mapping software program, but it was never released.

By 1990, The Stirling Group was selling a package of six products called the SHIELD Series, including InstallShield:

The Shield Series
Product	Description
DemoShield	Create demonstrations and tutorials
InstallShield	Create installation programs
UNInstallShield	Uninstall the specific software created with InstallShield
TbxShield	Toolbox controls
DbxShield	Dialog boxes
MemShield	Memory management library
LogShield	Session recording and playback

In 1993, The Stirling Group moved into larger offices in Schaumburg, Illinois and changed the company's name to Stirling Technologies, Inc. InstallShield became particularly well known after Microsoft endorsed it for use in Windows 95, and by 1997 Stirling Technologies estimated that it was being used in 85 to 90 percent of all software products written for Windows. Since 1996, the company operated under the InstallShield name until Macrovision acquired the business in 2004 for $76 million in cash plus an additional $20 million based on meeting sales targets.

Limited versions of InstallShield were at various times bundled with popular software development packages such as Microsoft Visual Studio 6.0, Borland Delphi 2006, and Borland C++Builder.

On 1 April 2008, the Macrovision Software Business Unit (including the InstallShield brand) was sold to private equity firm Thoma Cressey Bravo, forming a new company called Acresso Software. In October 2009, Acresso Software changed its name to Flexera Software.

In May 2020, Flexera rebranded its software monetization division focused on selling to software publishers as Revenera.

== See also ==
- List of installation software
