= Gracenote licensing controversy =

Issue affecting a music metadata provider licence

Music information company Gracenote changed its database terms to closed-source in 2001. This caused some controversy because Gracenote's ancestor, CDDB, had previously said its database was released under the GPL.

In 1998, CDDB was purchased by Escient, a consumer electronics manufacturer, and operated as a business unit within the Indiana-based company. CDDB was then spun off of Escient and in July 2000 was renamed Gracenote.

In 1999, freedb, an open source clone of the Gracenote CDDB service, was created by former CDDB users as a non-commercial alternative. The track listing database freedb used to seed its new service was based on the data released for public use by CDDB.

The CDDB database license was later changed to include new terms. For instance, any programs using a CDDB lookup had to display a CDDB logo while performing the lookup.

In March 2001, only licensed applications were provided access to the Gracenote database. New licenses for CDDB1 (the original version of CDDB) were no longer available, so programmers using Gracenote services were required to switch to CDDB2 (a new version incompatible with CDDB1).

To some, the decision was controversial because the CDDB database was started with the voluntary submission of CD track data by thousands of individual users. Initially, most of these were users of the xmcd CD player program. The xmcd program itself was an open-source, GPL project. Many listing contributors believed that the database was open-source as well, because in 1997, cddb.com's download and support pages had said it was released under the GPL. In 1998, CDDB asserted ownership of all submitted data and disallowed redistribution.

== Patent application ==
In July 1999 CDDB filed an application for a United States patent, titled Method and System for Finding Approximate Matches in Database. The patent is described as:

Entertainment content complementary to a musical recording is delivered to a user's computer by means of a computer network link. The user employs a browser to access the computer network. A plug-in for the browser is able to control an audio CD or other device for playing the musical recording. A script stored on the remote computer accessed over the network is downloaded. The script synchronizes the delivery of the complementary entertainment content with the play of the musical recording.

U.S. patent 6,061,680 was issued in May 2005, and has since been referenced by 107 other patents.

== Lawsuit against Roxio ==
=== Initial lawsuit ===
After Gracenote's change in licensing, Roxio made the decision to find another free music-recognition provider. In response to the competition, Gracenote filed a lawsuit with the patent at the base of its claims.

Gracenote, company that owns CDDB database, has filed a lawsuit against Roxio, Adaptec's spin-off company that develops Easy CD Creator (the most popular CD burning program in the world). Lawsuit is about Gracenote's CD recognition system; Roxio/Adaptec has used the technology in its Easy CD Creator and has paid all the licensing fees as they were supposed to, but now they didn't continue their contract that expired 22nd of April with Gracenote and have plans to use similar open-source database called FreeDB.org. Gracenote says that FreeDB, and therefore also Roxio, violates its patents and trademarks.

Roxio filed a motion to dismiss the case on the ground that the patent claim by Gracenote was invalid due to prior art. The court granted the motion and agreed in part, rendering one patent in question invalid due to prior art.

=== Countersuit ===
In June 2001, Roxio filed a countersuit against Gracenote. They asserted that Gracenote fraudulently obtained U.S. Patent 6061680 and its CDDB trademark by failing to disclose certain key information to the U.S. Patent and Trademark Office. On May 17, 2001, Gracenote filed a motion for a temporary restraining order seeking to block Roxio from shipping certain of its products. On May 24, 2001, the Court denied Gracenote's request finding that Gracenote failed to demonstrate a likelihood of success on the merits.

=== Settlement ===
Roxio and Gracenote signed an agreement making Gracenote the exclusive CD-recognition service for Roxio's software. In this way, Roxio was able to maintain access to the CDDB that they (and their customers) had relied on, while Gracenote was able to maintain access to their customer-base through Roxio without having to compete with free online databases.
