= Grip (software) =

CD ripper

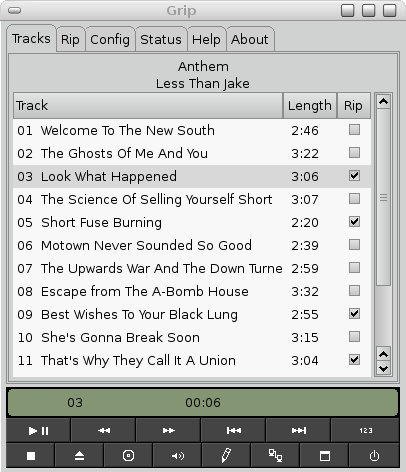
- Grip 3.2
- Developer(s): Grip developers
- Stable release: 4.2.4 / November 28, 2022; 2 years ago
- Repository: git.code.sf.net/p/grip/code
- Written in: C
- Operating system: Linux, Unix-like
- Type: CD ripper
- License: GNU General Public License
- Website: sourceforge.net/projects/grip/

Grip is a free CD player and CD ripper.

The software is rather similar to Audiograbber on Windows - without sound card capture feature; it is fast, lightweight, and easy to compile.

Grip uses a selection of encoders, including cdparanoia.

== History ==
The original author, Mike Oliphant, originally registered Grip as a project at SourceForge.net, the free and open-source software website, on March 17, 2000, and made pre-compiled binaries for RPM Linux distributions available. However, by mid-2005 development had stalled, and while the software was still very much usable, in effect it languished without a maintainer. In late 2016, a new maintainer, Johnny Solbu, stepped up by forking the project into "Grip 2" based on version 3.3.1 of the original. In April 2017, he gained access to the original project page and stated on the forked project page his intention to move development back to the old project, and release v3.3.5.

== Features ==
- Full-featured CD player with a small screen footprint in "condensed" mode
- Database lookup/submission to share track information over the net
- HTTP proxy support for those behind firewalls
- Loop, shuffle, and playlist modes
- Ripping of single, multiple, or partial tracks
- Encoding of ripped .wav files into Ogg Vorbis, MP3 or FLAC files.
- Simultaneous rip and encode
- Support for multiple encode processes on SMP machines
- Adding ID3v1/v2 tags to MP3 files after encoded
- Cooperating with DigitalDJ, a MySQL-based MP3 jukebox

== Gallery ==
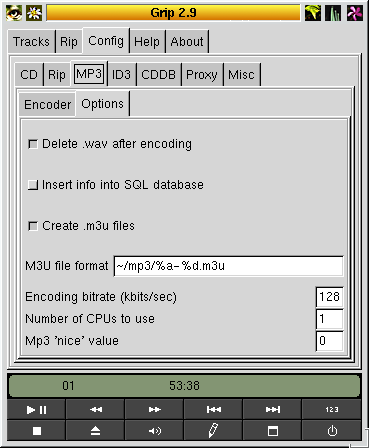
MP3 config options

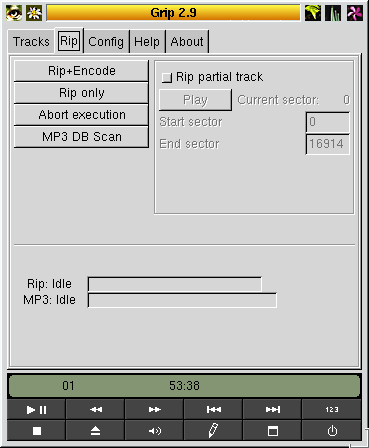
Ripping options

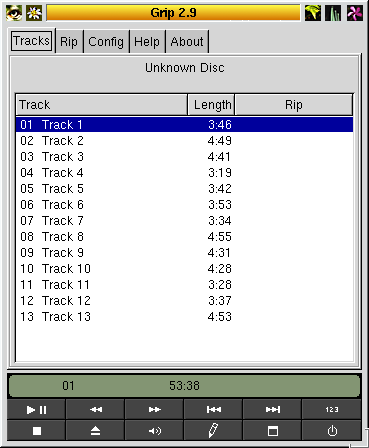
Track listing

== See also ==
- Sound Juicer – The official CD ripper of GNOME
- Asunder – Another GTK-based CD ripper
