= Freedb =

Database of compact disc track listings

- Website type: Data library
- Dissolved: June 2020
- Successor: gnudb.org
- Owner: Magix (since 2006)
- Industry: Audio metadata
- Website: www.freedb.org
- Commercial: No
- Launched: 2001
- Current status: Offline

Freedb was a database of user-submitted compact disc track listings, where all the content was under the GNU General Public License. To look up CD information over the Internet, a client program calculated a hash function from the CD table of contents and used it as a disc ID to query the database. If the disc was in the database, the client was able to retrieve and display the artist, album title, track list and some additional information.

Freedb was launched in 2001 based on the CDDB (Compact Disc DataBase) after it had been changed to a proprietary license and renamed "Gracenote". As of 24 April 2006, the Freedb database held just under 2,000,000 CDs. As of 2007, MusicBrainz – a project with similar goals – had a Freedb gateway that allowed access to their own database. The Freedb gateway was shut down on March 18, 2019.

In 2020, Freedb was shut down by Magix, a German company that had acquired it in 2006.

== History ==
=== Predecessor ===
The original software behind CDDB was released under the GNU General Public License, and many people submitted CD information thinking the service would also remain free. The license was later changed, however, and some programmers complained that the new license included certain terms that they couldn't accept: if one wanted to access CDDB, one was not allowed to access any other CDDB-like database (such as Freedb), and any programs using a CDDB lookup had to display a CDDB logo while performing the lookup.

=== Creation ===
In March 2001, CDDB, now owned by Gracenote, banned all unlicensed applications from accessing their database. New licenses for CDDB1 (the original version of CDDB) were no longer available, since Gracenote wanted to force programmers to switch to CDDB2 (a new version incompatible with CDDB1 and hence with Freedb). The license change motivated the Freedb project, which is intended to remain free.

In a 2006 interview with Wired, CDDB co-creator Steve Scherf pushed back against criticism that with the license change, Gracenote had privatized a public good created by the work of unpaid volunteers, noting that the data submitted to CDDB before the license remained available for download on freedb, and arguing that the stagnation of freedb at that point showed that "the focus and dedication required for CDDB to grow could not be found in a community effort".

Because it inherited CDDB's limitations, there is no data field in the Freedb database for composer. This limits its usefulness for classical music CDs. Furthermore, CDs in a series are often introduced in the database by different people, resulting in inconsistent spelling and naming conventions across discs.

Freedb was used primarily by media players, cataloguers, audio taggers and CD ripper software. As of version 6 of the Freedb protocol, Freedb accepted and returned UTF-8 data.

=== Acquisition by Magix ===
Magix acquired Freedb in 2006. MusicBrainz – a project with similar goals – released a Freedb gateway in 2007, allowing users to harvest information from the MusicBrainz database rather than Freedb. This service was shuttered in 2019. A 2011 review observed that "unlike the flat file database structure of freedb.org, MusicBrainz is structured as a relational database, which has allowed MusicBrainz to expand its scope."

=== Closure ===
In June 2020, Freedb.org went offline (after its impending shutdown had been announced in March 2020). Asked by Heise News about the reasons for the service's demise, Magix stated that the updates required by a changing legal and technical environment had made it uneconomical to maintain. An expert quoted by Heise ruled out server costs as the reason, observing that a single request to the service amounted to just around five kilobytes of transferred data.

=== gnudb ===
gnudb.org, short for 'Global Network Universal Database', has continued to provide the Freedb.org database after Freedb.org was shut down. gnudb.org is not affiliated with the GNU project.

== Client software ==
Freedb‐aware applications include:

- Asunder
- Audiograbber
- CDex
- cdrdao
- Exact Audio Copy
- foobar2000
- fre:ac
- Grip
- JetAudio
- Mp3tag
- MediaMonkey
- puddletag
- Quod Libet

== See also ==
- List of online music databases
- MusicBrainz
- CDDB § Example calculation of a CDDB1 (FreeDB) disc ID
