= Mic in track =

Mic in track (as well as Line in track and Mixer in track) was the default name of a file created after recording with the program MusicMatch Jukebox. In the late 1990s and early 2000s, Mic in track files began appearing on file-sharing networks such as Napster, usually without the knowledge of their creators. Because of the unique name, voyeurs could easily search for the files and listen to audio of unknowing individuals performing karaoke or joking around with friends. Several websites are devoted to cataloging and featuring their favorite Mic in track files.

== See also ==
- List of music software
