= James Monaco =

American film critic, author, publisher and educator (1942–2019)

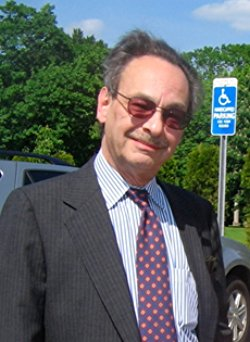
- Born: November 15, 1942; Flushing, New York, U.S.
- Died: November 25, 2019 (aged 77); Manhattan, New York, U.S.
- Occupations: Film critic, film historian, publisher
- Years active: 1965–2019
- Spouse(s): Susan Schenker (3 children)
- Website: http://www.JamesMonaco.com

James F. Monaco (November 15, 1942 – November 25, 2019) was an American film critic, author, publisher, and educator.

== Life and work ==
Monaco founded Baseline in 1982, an early online database about the entertainment industry, and a forerunner of the IMDb. It was taken over by The New York Times Company in 2006. In 2011 the Times sold the company to Project Hollywood LLC, which is majority owned by entrepreneurs Laurie Silvers and Mitchell Rubenstein, who sold it to Gracenote in 2014 for a reported $50 million.

He has taught at The New School for Social Research, Columbia University, New York University, and the City University of New York. He was a media commentator for Morning Edition on NPR in the 1980s, and has written for The New York Times, The Village Voice, and The Christian Science Monitor.

He wrote several books, including The New Wave: Truffaut, Godard, Chabrol, Rohmer, Rivette (1976), How To Read A Film (1977, 1981, 1999, 2009) and American Film Now (1979). Monaco was also a contributing editor and writer to the Canadian film magazine, Take One, for many years.

He was the founder and president of UNET 2 Corporation, and he ran Harbor Electronic Publishing in New York and Sag Harbor. In 2012 he co-founded the Long Island Nature Organization, Inc., sponsors of the annual Long Island Natural History Conference.

Since 2001 In Germany a reputable student film award is named after James F. Monaco, "Der Goldene Monaco" or The Golden Monaco.

Every year the student award is handed over to the winners in a large Oscar like show in front of up to 1,600 students in the , a large venue in the city of the University of Siegen, where the award was born.

James Monaco died of vascular disease on November 25, 2019.

== Published works ==
- The New Wave: Truffaut, Godard, Chabrol, Rohmer, Rivette. Oxford University Press, 1976
- How to Read A Film: Movies, Media, and Beyond. Oxford University Press, 1977, 1981, 2000, 2009
- Celebrity. Dell, 1978
- Media Culture. Dell, 1978
- Alain Resnais: The Role of Imagination. Oxford University Press, 1978
- American Film Now: The People, The Power, The Money, The Movies. Oxford University Press, 1979. New York Zoetrope, updated edition 1984
- Who's Who in American Film Now. New York Zoetrope, 1981, updated edition 1987
- The French Revolutionary Calendar. New York Zoetrope, 1982.
- The Connoisseur's Guide to the Movies. Facts on File Publications, 1985
- The International Encyclopedia of Film. Putnam and Virgin, 1991
- The Movie Guide. Putnam and Virgin, 1992, 1994
- Cinemania: Interactive Movie Guide - DVD-ROM. (Contributor) Microsoft, 1992
- The Dictionary of New Media. Harbor Electronic Publishing, 1999
- How To Read a Film: Multimedia Edition. Harbor Electronic Publishing, 2000
