= Fre:ac =

Audio converter and CD ripper

fre:ac
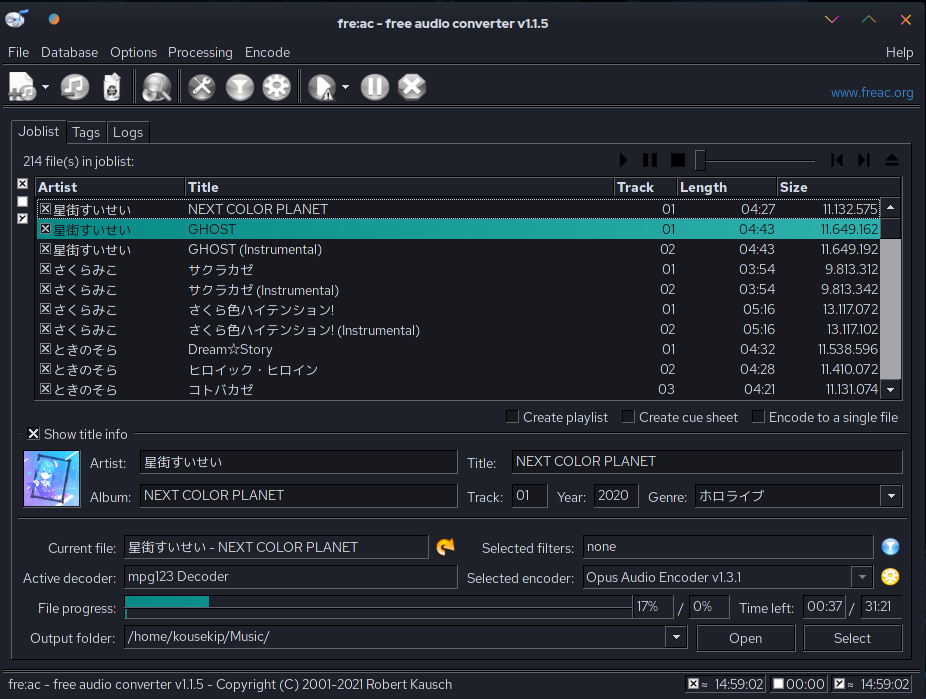
- Developer: Robert Kausch
- Initial release: May 12, 2001; 24 years ago (as BonkEnc)
- Stable release: 1.1.7 / 5 March 2023
- Repository: github.com/enzo1982/freac
- Written in: C, C++
- Operating system: Windows, Linux, macOS, FreeBSD
- Type: CD ripper
- License: GPL-2.0-or-later
- Website: www.freac.org

fre:ac is a free audio converter and CD extractor for Windows, Linux, macOS, and FreeBSD, distributed under the GPL-2.0-or-later.

Besides extracting audio from compact discs (with various features including hidden track detection), fre:ac can also convert audio files from one format to another or to the same format at a lower bitrate (a higher bitrate can be forced but this does not increase the quality of the output, instead resulting in an overall loss). fre:ac is compatible with many audio formats such as Ogg Vorbis, FLAC, MP3, MP4/M4A, AAC, WAV, WMA, and more. fre:ac uses the CDex library to convert from CDs and uses freedb to retrieve artist/song information from the internet which is written to the files as various types of ID3 tags; this library supports cdparanoia which aims to improve audio quality. The user interface is multilingual with 43 languages and is able to be a portable install on a USB drive.

== History ==
The first public version of fre:ac was published in 2001 under the name BonkEnc. The program was originally developed to convert audio to the proprietary lossy/lossless Bonk format, as well as MP3. After several 0.x versions, with added support for other formats and extracting audio from compact discs, version 1.0 Beta 1 was released on July 5, 2003 which officially marked the beginning of the beta phase.

Finally, on February 21, 2007 the first stable version of the program, version 1.0, was released.

The project changed its name to fre:ac with the release of version 1.0.17 on November 14, 2010.

On March 29, 2020 the project released fre:ac 1.1 as a major update adding native support for Linux, macOS and FreeBSD. The 1.1 update also introduced support for multithreaded file conversions, DSP processing, multichannel audio and an integrated tag editor and removed support for the Bonk format after which the program was named until 2010.

Starting from version 1.1.5, fre:ac has AccurateRip support. The latest update, version 1.1.7, was released on Monday, March 6, 2023.

== Awards ==
fre:ac won the SourceForge Community Choice Project of the Month award in October 2015. In May 2018 it was selected as the SourceForge Staff-Pick Project of the Month.

== See also ==
- List of free software for audio
