= CD ripper =

Software that converts audio on Compact Disc to digital files

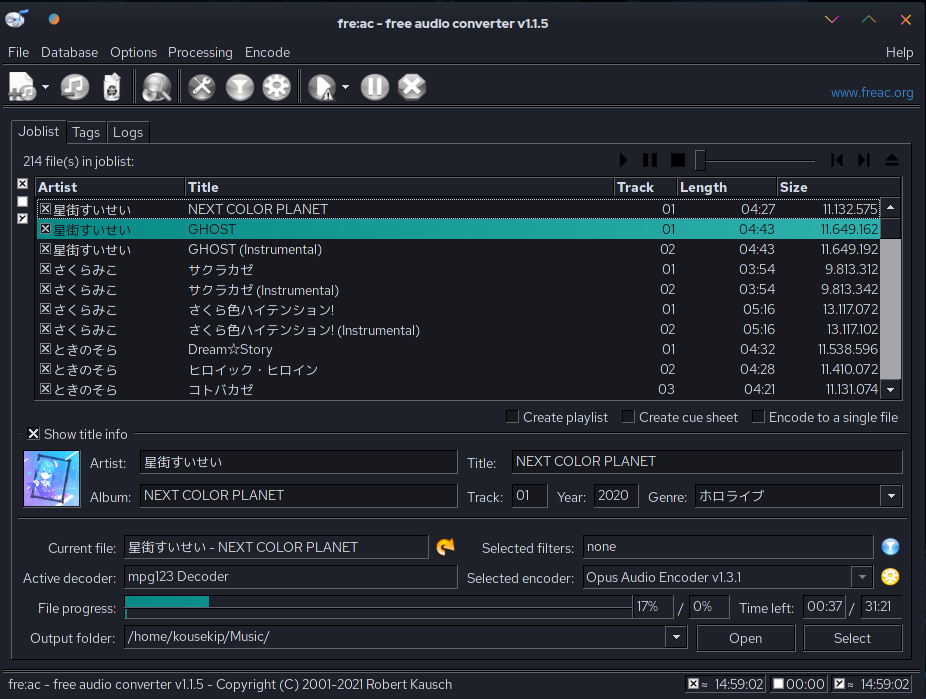
fre:ac, a CD extractor and audio converter

A CD ripper is software that extracts raw digital audio in Compact Disc Digital Audio format tracks on a compact disc to standard computer sound files, such as WAV or MP3.

A more formal term used for the process of ripping audio CDs is digital audio extraction (DAE).

== History ==
In the early days of computer CD-ROM drives and audio compression mechanisms (such as MP2), CD ripping was considered undesirable by copyright holders, with some attempting to retrofit copy protection into the ISO 9660 standard. As time progressed, most music publishers became more open to the idea that since individuals had bought the music, they should be able to create a copy for their own personal use on their own computer.

== Etymology ==
The Jargon File entry for rip notes that the term originated in Amiga slang, where it referred to the extraction of multimedia content from program data.

== Design ==
As an intermediate step, some ripping programs save the extracted audio in a lossless format such as WAV. The extracted audio can then be encoded with a lossy codec like MP3. The encoded files are more compact and are suitable for playback on portable media players.

Most ripping programs will assist in tagging the encoded files with metadata. The MP3 file format, for example, supports ID3 tag with title, artist, album and track number information. Some will try to identify the disc being ripped by looking up network services like LASSO, FreeDB, Gracenote's CDDB, or MusicBrainz, or attempt text extraction if CD-Text has been stored.

When the user's end goal is to produce a CD copy of a CD, some all-in-one ripping programs can simplify the process by ripping and burning the audio to disc in one step.

Not all CD rippers read or copy Compact Disc subcodes, a fact exploited by several types of digital rights management (DRM) and copy protection to prevent successful copying of discs or to prevent effective use of software copied from discs. CloneCD is able to copy subcode data to bypass certain types of DRM.

== Technical challenges ==
Ripping a CD to audio files that will faithfully reproduce the same CD if burned again is not trivial. Such a rip (along with a cue sheet file and other metadata describing the layout of the files on the disc) is sometimes referred to as an accurate, perfect or secure rip. Some CD ripping software is specifically intended to provide accurate rips, including CloneCD, Exact Audio Copy, cdda2wav, CDex, cdparanoia.

In the context of digital audio extraction from compact discs, seek jitter causes extracted audio samples to be doubled-up or skipped entirely when the drive re-seeks. The problem occurs because the Red Book standard does not require block-accurate addressing during seeking. (Note: Due to additional sector level addressing added in the Yellow Book, CD-ROM data discs are not subject to seek jitter.) As a result, the extraction process may restart a few samples early or late, resulting in doubled or omitted samples. These glitches often sound like tiny repeating clicks during playback. A successful approach to correction in software involves performing overlapping reads and fitting the data to match the overlapping sections. Professional CD duplication avoids seek jitter by extracting the entire disc in one continuous read operation, using special CD drive models at slower speeds so the drive does not re-seek.

Properties of an optical drive helping in achieving a perfect rip are a small sample offset (at best zero), no jitter, no or deactivatable caching, and a correct implementation and feedback of the C1 and C2 error states. There are databases listing these features for multiple brands and versions of optical drives. Also, EAC has the ability to autodetect some of these features by a test-rip of a known reference CD.

One approach that can be used to confirm a successful rip is to compare its checksum to known good rips from an online database.

== Notable applications ==
Notable CD rippers application software include the following:

BSD and Linux

- Asunder
- Cdda2wav
- cdparanoia
- fre:ac
- Grip
- K3b
- Sound Juicer
- VLC media player

Mac OS X

- cdparanoia
- fre:ac
- iTunes
- VLC media player

Windows

- Audiograbber
- CDex
- CloneCD
- Exact Audio Copy
- foobar2000
- fre:ac
- iTunes
- JRiver Media Center
- MediaMonkey
- Musicmatch Jukebox
- VLC media player
- Winamp
- Windows Media Player

== See also ==
- Blu-ray ripper
- Comparison of DVD ripper software
- Hard disk recorder
- Ripping § DVD ripping
