= CDex =

CD ripper

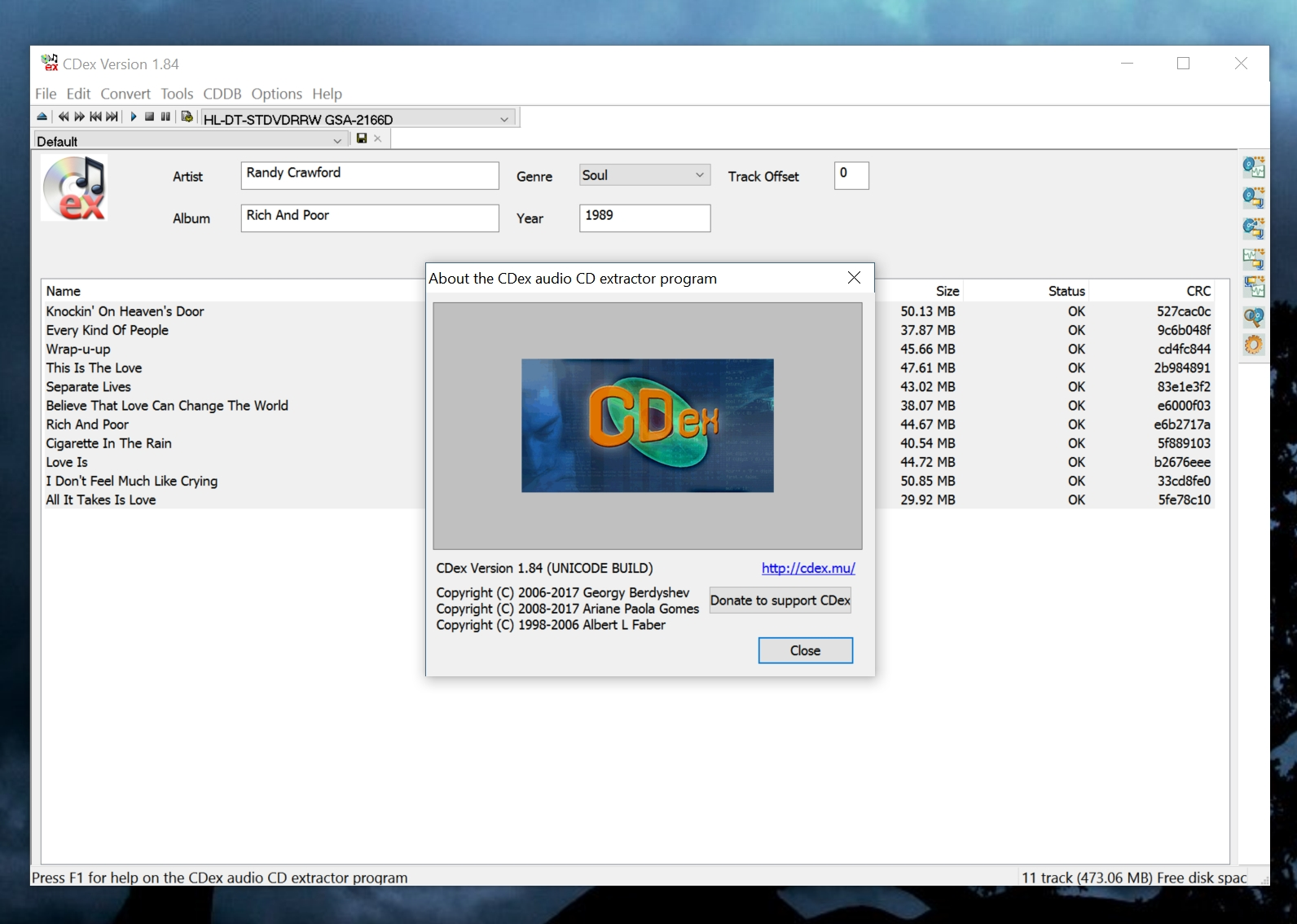
- CDex software program at the 1.84 release in use on Windows 10
- Developers: Albert Faber, Georgy Berdyshev
- Initial release: 2000; 25 years ago
- Stable release: 2.24 / 12 August 2020; 5 years ago
- Written in: C, C++, Python
- Operating system: Microsoft Windows
- Type: CD ripper
- License: Freeware (ad supported)
- Website: cdex.mu

CDex is a freeware software package for Digital Audio Extraction from Audio CD (a so-called CD ripper) and audio format conversion for Microsoft Windows. It converts CDDA tracks from a CD to standard computer sound files, such as WAV, MP3, or Ogg Vorbis. CDex was previously released as free software under the terms of the GNU General Public License (GPL); however, although the website claims that this is still the case, no source code has been released since 2005. It was originally written by Albert L. Faber, and is developed and maintained by Georgy Berdyshev. Recent versions of the software may be compromised and a security threat.

== Features ==
CDex is able to convert CD audio into several formats including WAV, Vorbis, MP3 (using the LAME encoder), VQF, Musepack, APE, and many others. As of version 1.70b2 FLAC encoding is native, but for version 1.51 FLAC and other codecs can be used by using an external encoder. It supports CD-Text to allow ripped tracks, with reduced user effort, to have the names of songs, artists and albums. It can also automatically identify (most) inserted audio CDs and look up the metadata by means of an online database (freedb) for automatic tagging, naming and sorting of ripped files. It also includes cdparanoia for robust CD reading. CDex is considered to be very configurable and relatively easy to use.

== History ==
In 2000, at the start of the beta phase for version 1.30, CDex was turned into a free software project (cdexos: CDex Open Source) and hosted on SourceForge.net. In January 2006, the CDex homepage requested a new project manager and developer, implying that Albert L. Faber had abandoned development of CDex. On 5 June 2006, CDex 1.70 Beta 1 was released via the SourceForge.net website (ascribed to Georgy Berdyshev). It was the first official update to the program in almost three years, with CDex 1.70 Beta 2 following soon after on 23 June 2006. In 2008 Berdyshev was joined by Ariane Gomes as project developers. On 18 November 2009 CDex 1.70 Beta 4 was released. CDex 1.70 Final was released on 29 June 2014 featuring a Unicode and Multibyte version.

On 30 June 2007, just one day after the release of the GPLv3, the license of CDex was updated. However, the last version for which source code was made available is 1.70 Beta 2, and the SourceForge project appears to have been shut down in July 2015, shortly after the release of version 1.79.

From version 1.76 the installer includes the adware OpenCandy.

In November 2017 version 1.96 was released. It is not clear who is the current code maintainer, and no contact details are provided. Four further versions were released by March 2018.

The default Remote Server database in CDEx, Freedb, became inaccessible by June 2020. The gnudb.org site at location gnudb.gnudb.org (on HTTP port 80) using proxy.gnudb.org works as a replacement for the inactive default Remote Server database.

== Potential risks and adware controversy ==
Online discussions over concerns relating to the safety and security of CDex have been ongoing since at least 2013 with many asserting that the software has become malware. Post-2013 reincarnations of CDex have seen a number of sponsored programs being automatically selected (or selected without any knowledge at all) during installation with little information about their nature. Scan results suggest there may be risks attached to installing them.

Open source commentators have suggested that the current maintainer and software should not be trusted and even that CDex should be avoided outright. Support links are now broken and the ticketing system no longer exists. There are no contact details provided or any way to interact with the developer. The installer bundles adware without any notifications. Despite updates nominally being made to the application, some of these have involved bundling the installer with hidden adware. MalwareBytes has adopted the stance, as of 2019, that CDex contains potentially unwanted programs and thus flags the CDex package as malware. The rolling back of source code availability has prevented a proper audit and stymied any potential defence of CDex's case. Further, anecdotal discussion has resulted in claims that versions of CDex from the latter half of the 2010s are adding artifacts to the ends of certain tracks ripped by the program.
