= C2 error =

A C2 error is a read error of a Compact Disc. C2 errors can to a degree be recovered by the hardware error detection and correction scheme. A CD drive can have extraction errors when the data on the disc is not readable due to scratches or smudges causing C1 errors in individual frames of data. The drive can compensate by reconstructing the missing data from error correction codes. C2 error correction is an analysis over many interleaved frames. C2 error correction codes are also used by the Digital Audio Tape (DAT) format. C2 errors can cause problems for CD rippers when copying CD-Audio discs, and specialized software exists to overcome this problem, such as Exact Audio Copy.

Some copy protection schemes add false C2 errors to discs to discourage copying.

While causing data loss on Video CDs (Mode 2 Form 2) and Audio CDs, individual C2 errors are correctable on data CDs (using Mode 1 and Mode 2 Form 1).

== Measurement ==
C2 errors can be measured using surface error scanning, and are usually caused by scratches and dirt on the data surface, as well as media degradation.

Error scanning functionality and support varies among vendors and models of optical disc drives.

== See also ==
- Optical disc § Surface error scanning
