= Sound Juicer =

CD ripper

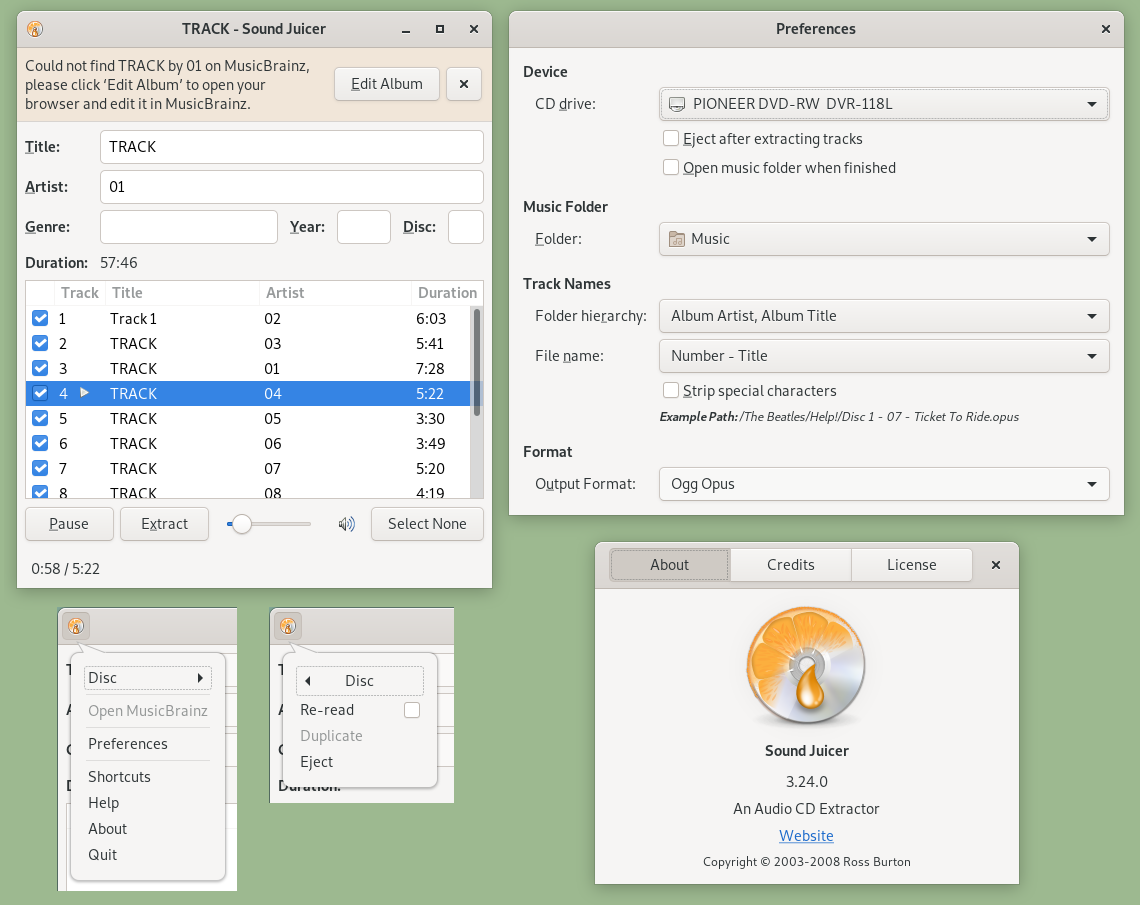
- Sound Juicer 3.24.0 (running on GNOME)
- Original author: Ross Burton
- Developer: The GNOME Project
- Stable release: 3.40.0 (June 16, 2023; 3 years ago) [±]
- Preview release: Non [±]
- Written in: C (GTK)
- Operating system: Linux, Unix-like
- Type: CD ripper
- Licence: GNU General Public License
- Website: wiki.gnome.org/Apps/SoundJuicer
- Repository: gitlab.gnome.org/GNOME/sound-juicer.git

Sound Juicer is the official CD ripper program of GNOME. It is based on GTK, GStreamer, and libburnia for reading and writing optical discs. It can extract audio tracks from optical audio discs and convert them into audio files that a personal computer or digital audio player can play. It supports ripping to any audio codec supported by a GStreamer plugin, such as Opus, MP3, Ogg Vorbis, FLAC and uncompressed PCM formats. Versions after 2.12 implement CD playing capability. Last versions produce lossy formats with default GStreamer settings.

Sound Juicer is designed to be easy to use and to work with little user intervention. For example, if the computer is connected to the Internet, it will automatically attempt to retrieve track information from the freely available MusicBrainz service. Sound Juicer is free and open-source software under the terms of the GNU GPL. Starting with version 2.10 it is an official part of the GNOME.

== See also ==
- Asunder – another GTK-based CD ripper
- Grip – another GTK-based CD ripper
- fre:ac
