= TMS (entertainment data) =

American metadata company

- Formerly: Tribune Media Services
- Type: Private
- Industry: Media
- Founded: 1965; 61 years ago
- Headquarters: Queensbury, New York, United States
- Key people: Daniel Kazan, CEO; John B. Kelleher, President and COO
- Products: TV and movie data, photos, movie trailers, research products, EPG scrolling guide
- Services: Entertainment, information technology and services
- Owner: Nielsen
- Number of employees: 500 (2013)

TMS (previously Tribune Media Services) is an American company that is an international provider of data for TV and movies. As part of its On Entertainment product line, the company supplies data to companies such as TiVo, Roku, Virgin Media, DIRECTV and Time Warner Cable to enable entertainment guides and applications.

In addition, the metadata is used for media measurement and analysis. TMS also produces Zap2it, a social TV hub that connects entertainment fans to popular TV shows, movies, celebrities, and other fans. TMS is a data provider for over 4,000 companies. The company is headquartered in upstate New York.

TMS IDs (TMSID) are 14 digit alphanumeric identifiers where the first two characters identify the program type, e.g., EP is episode.

== History ==
=== Foundation and early years 1965 - 2010 ===
The company was founded in 1965 to as TV listings business TV Data in upstate New York with service to newspapers nationwide.

In 1980, rival TV listings business 'Torrington Data' is founded in upstate New York. and in 1982, Torrington Data is sold in part to the Chicago-based Tribune Company. The venture is known as 'Torrington/Tribune Data LP'.

In 1984, Tribune Media Services (TMS) is formed as a merger of three groups: the Tribune Company Syndicate, the Electronic Services division of the Orlando Sentinel and an experienced group exploring applications of electronic technology within the Tribune Company

In 1985, Tribune Company acquires National TV Log of Pasadena, CA, which sold bold-faced ads in TV program listings on behalf of newspapers. They also acquired controlling interest in Torrington/Tribune Data (TTD). The National TV Log and Torrington/Tribune Data (TTD) groups are reorganized as Tribune TV Log and eventually moved under the Tribune Company's new Tribune Media Services (TMS) subsidiary with four offices in New York, NY; Queensbury, NY; Chicago, IL; and Pasadena, CA.

In 1999, TMS makes two acquisitions: JDTV, a distributor of programming information to cable and satellite system operators via print guides and owner of UltimateTV website; and Premier DataVision, a distributor of movie showtime data and advertisements. TMS launches Zap2it in the form of an Electronic Program Guide (EPG) and also markets Zap2it as a multiplatform product line.

In 2000, Tribune Company announces its $6.5 billion purchase of the Times-Mirror Corporation, whose assets include The Los Angeles Times, Newsday and other newspaper, publishing, TV and online investments. Upon the acquisition, the Los Angeles Times Syndicate is merged into TMS. In 2001, TMS announced it has purchased a majority interest in TV Data.

In 2004, TMS opened an office in Amsterdam, Netherlands to expand its European business.

In 2007, TMS launches the ‘On’ product line, an evolution of the ‘Big Build’ suite of products — this data is produced in XML format. In 2010, TMS purchased CastTV.

=== Split and new owner 2011 - Present ===
In 2011, the Tribune Company announces TMS will be split into two separate businesses. TMS restructures the Entertainment Products Division to operate as a standalone business and part of the Tribune Investments portfolio while the News & Features Division merges with the larger Tribune Publishing group

In 2013, Tribune Media Services was rebranding as TMS. That same year, Tribune Company announces the acquisition of Gracenote with plans to combine Gracenote with TMS.

In 2016, Nielsen Acquires Gracenote (which includes the legacy TMS business) from Tribune Company.

== Services ==
TMS provides entertainment data and guidance technology for customers including consumer electronics manufacturers, cable operators, entertainment platforms, application developers, studios and research companies.

Its products include APIs for movies, TV shows, celebrities and televised sports; an electronic programming guide; and a research tool for tracking data for TV programming.
