= Asunder (software) =

Audio CD ripper program for Unix-like systems

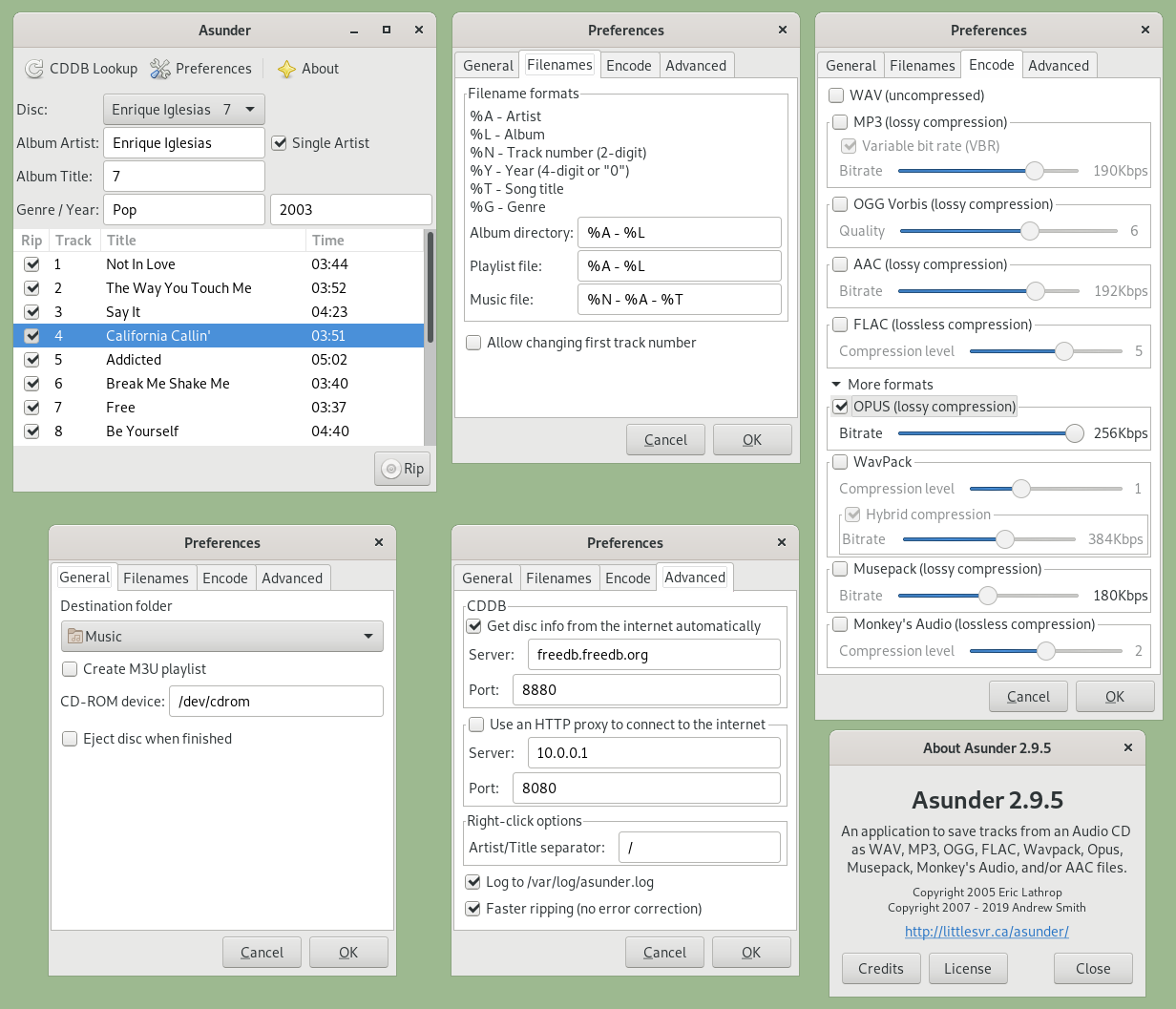
- Asunder 2.9.5 (2019-10) (running on GNOME with default GTK theme)
- Original author: Andrew Smith
- Stable release: 3.0.1 / 26 July 2023; 2 years ago
- Written in: C (GTK2)
- Operating system: Linux, BSDs
- Platform: GTK
- Type: CD ripper
- License: GNU GPL v2
- Website: littlesvr.ca/asunder
- Repository: littlesvr.ca/prog/asunder

Asunder is a free and open-source graphical (GTK 2) audio CD ripper program for Unix-like systems. It doesn't have dependencies to the GNOME libraries (GStreamer and dconf) or libraries of other desktop environments. It functions as a front-end for cdparanoia.

Its first version was released in January 2005. Asunder is free software released under the GNU General Public License version 2.

== Features ==
- Saves audio tracks as WAV, MP3, Vorbis, FLAC, Opus, WavPack, Musepack, AAC, or Monkey's Audio files
- Uses CDDB protocol to name and tag each track (freedb.freac.org is the changeable default source)
- Creates M3U playlists
- Simultaneously rips and encodes
- Can encode to multiple formats in one session
- Allows for each track to be tagged by a different artist
- Does not require a specific desktop environment (just GTK)

== See also ==
- Sound Juicer – The official CD ripper of GNOME
- Other CD rippers for Linux
