= Libburnia =

Optical disc authoring software

- Initial release: 2006
- Stable release: 1.5.6 / June 20, 2023; 2 years ago
- Written in: C
- Operating system: Cross-platform
- Type: Library (computer science)
- License: GNU General Public License
- Website: dev.lovelyhq.com/libburnia/web/wiki

Libburnia is a project that develops a collection of libraries and command-line tools for burning CDs, DVDs and Blu-ray media.

== Project overview ==
Libburnia is the name of a project to develop various pieces of disk recording software.

- libisofs is the library to create or modify ISO 9660 disk images.
- libburn is the underlying programming library. It is used by xorriso, cdrskin and 3rd party disk recording applications can also use this library directly.
- libisoburn is an add-on to libburn and libisofs which coordinates both and also allows to grow ISO 9660 filesystem images on multi-session and overwriteable media.
- xorriso is a CLI application that creates, loads, manipulates and writes ISO 9660 filesystem images with Rock Ridge extensions. This package is part of the GNU Project.
- xorrisofs creates an ISO9660+Rock Ridge disc images from local files, optionally with a Joliet directory tree.
- xorrecord writes disc images to physical discs.
- cdrskin is the end-user application of libburnia. It is CLI-only and its syntax is mostly identical to cdrecord to act as a drop-in replacement for existing front-ends.

== GNU xorriso ==
Xorriso stands for X/Open, Rock Ridge ISO and is the main command-line tool included with libburnia. It allows both generation and (to some extent) update of image files as well as burning images to the disk.

xorriso copies file objects from POSIX compliant filesystems into Rock Ridge enhanced ISO 9660 filesystems and allows session-wise manipulation of such filesystems. It can load the management information of existing ISO images and it writes the session results to optical media or to filesystem objects. Vice versa xorriso is able to copy file objects out of ISO 9660 filesystems.

It provides a command-line interface for single operations as well as GNU Readline and Dialog-based interfaces.

== Uses ==
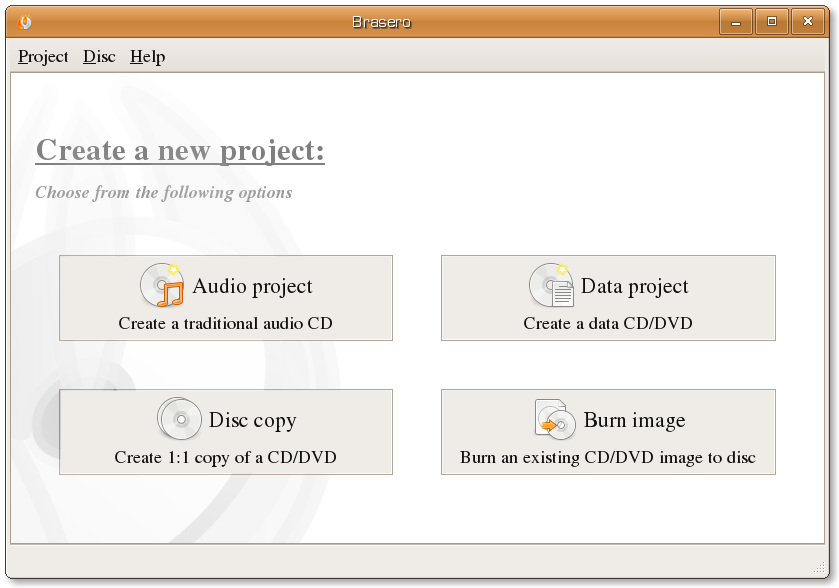
Image of the Brasero burning application

- The underlying libburn library is used directly as sole recording back-end for Xfce's graphical Xfburn application which is included in the default installation of Xubuntu since version 10.10.
- GNOME's default disk recording application, Brasero, can use libburn directly without relying on cdrecord compatibility of cdrskin.
- FlBurn is a FLTK application that uses libburn directly.
- cdrskin is similar to cdrecord and wodim, and can be used in place of the aforementioned tool in GUI front-ends such as K3b.

== History ==
The first public release (libburn-0.2.2) was in September 2006.

The current stable version is 1.5.6, which was released on June 20, 2023.

== Features ==
- Blanking/formatting of CD-RW DVD-RW, DVD+RW, DVD-RAM, BD
- Burning of data or audio tracks to CD, either in versatile Track-at-Once mode (TAO) or in Session-at-Once mode for seamless tracks.
- Multi-session on CD (follow-up sessions in TAO only) or on DVD-R[W] (in Incremental mode) or on DVD+R.
- Single session on DVD-RW or DVD-R (Disk-at-once) or on over-writable DVD+RW, DVD-RW, DVD-RAM, BD-RE.
- Bus scan, burn-free, speed options, retrieving media info, padding, fifo.
- Works with SATA DVD drives.
- Write access to disk images.
- Use UNIX device path (/dev/hdX) on Linux
- You do not need to be superuser for its daily usage.

== See also ==
- cdrkit
- cdrtools
- dvd+rw-tools
