= Brasero (software) =

Open-source disc-burning GUI front-end

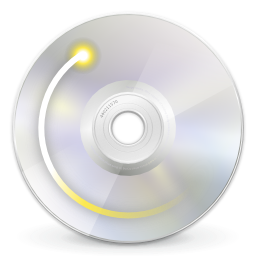

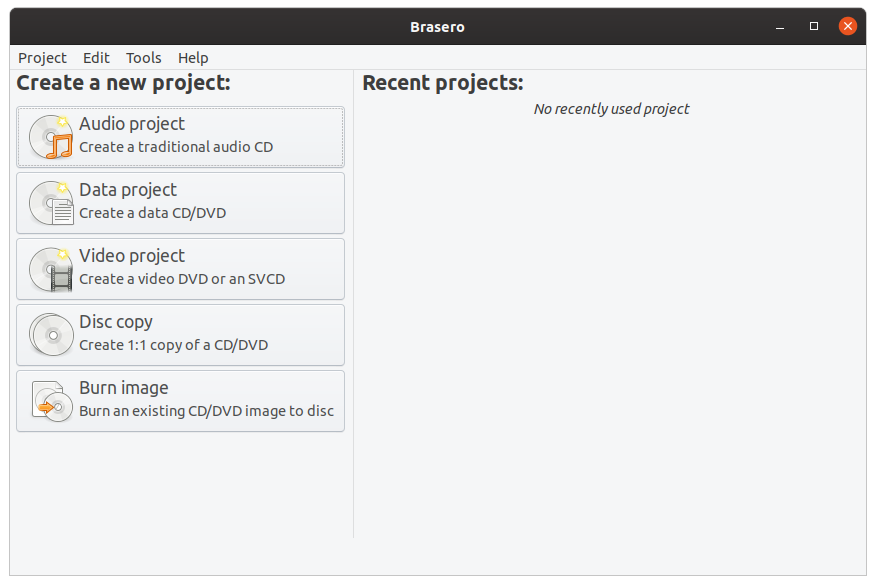
- Brasero 3.12.2
- Developers: Philippe Rouquier, Luis Medinas
- Stable release: 3.12.3 / 20 September 2021; 5 years ago
- Written in: C
- Operating system: Unix-like
- Type: Optical disc operations
- License: GNU General Public License
- Website: wiki.gnome.org/Apps/Brasero
- Repository: gitlab.gnome.org/GNOME/brasero

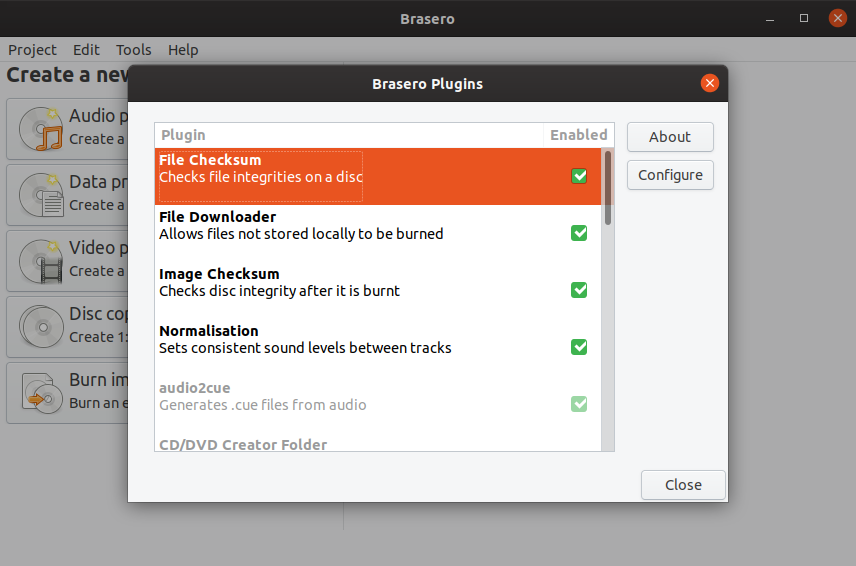
Plugins window on Ubuntu Linux

Brasero is a free and open-source disc-burning program for Unix-like operating systems, it serves as a graphical front-end (using GTK) to cdrtools, cdrskin, growisofs, and (optionally) libburn. It is licensed under the terms of the GNU General Public License.

== History ==
Brasero was developed by Philippe Rouquier & Luis Medinas. The project was originally named Bonfire, but was renamed after the Spanish word brasero for a small heater used to provide warmth for people sitting at a table.

Early releases of the application were well received. In a review in April 2007 published in Free Software Magazine Robin Monks concluded:

Brasero is a much simpler disk burning solution, and has a nicer user experience over GnomeBaker. I would recommend this for those who don’t want to think much about their disk burner, and just want it to work.

After further development and the inclusion of Brasero 0.7.1 in Ubuntu 8.04 Hardy Heron in April 2008 the application received further press reviews. In May 2008 Ryan Paul of Ars Technica said:

Brasero's start screen is very intuitive and user-friendly, but the default configuration for the project interface feels a bit cluttered because it includes a bulky file browsing widget. Users can add files to a project by selecting them in the built-in file browsing component or by dragging and dropping them from the regular file manager. A bar at the bottom will show how much space the selected files use relative to the total capacity of the disc. Brasero is similar to KDE's K3B burning program, but lacks a few of K3B's really advanced features like automatic video encoding support for DVDs and VCDs. Despite a few omissions like that, Brasero is very complete and is far more useful than the simplistic CD/DVD Creator that is built into the GNOME file manager. I burned several data CDs and DVDs with Brasero to test its reliability. The program crashed once while I was adding files, but never had any problems at all while burning.

Brasero was later integrated into GNOME and the version numbers were aligned with GNOME desktop version numbering. Ars Technica reviewed Brasero 2.26, then the newest version, in March 2009, saying:

[Brasero has] improved a bit since [2008] and has added support for video and several other features. The project user interface, however, seems to have worsened. They have gotten rid of the useful disc capacity meter at the bottom and replaced it with a size indicator element that is displayed next to each item in the file list.

They have also added a file filtering mechanism of some kind at the bottom of the window. It isn't entirely clear to me what purpose it is supposed to serve, but it seems like unnecessary clutter. I also strongly dislike the superfluous file preview feature which wastes a lot of screen space in order to display a playable video thumbnail. The preview feature is fortunately easy to disable.

The whole programs feels uncharacteristically clunky by GNOME standards, but it's a lot more functional than the stale and unambitious CD burning component that was included in previous versions of GNOME. I think that Brasero is the right way forward in the long term, but the user interface really doesn't please me.

My biggest complaint with the old Nautilus CD burner is that it didn't give you clear visual hints about how much space you have left when you are putting in files to burn. The fact that Brasero dropped that feature is a bit of a disappointment. It seems like the task of building a good disc burning UI with GTK is not trivial and it's something that I suspect will take a skilled designer rather than a developer.

Despite the problems with Brasero's interface, it's really a very capable program with a rich feature set, which leaves me hopeful that it will be able to really shine someday.

Brasero was at one time the default CD/DVD application in the GNOME desktop, but with more modern computer hardware omitting optical drives, it was removed from the GNOME core feature set with version 3.8 in 2013.

== Features ==
=== Data ===
Brasero supports both CD and DVD formats. It allows for editing of the disc contents and can remove, move and rename files that are located inside folders. It can also burn data to CD/DVDs on the fly.

The application allows automatic filtering for unwanted files, including hidden files, broken and recursive symlinks and files not conforming to the Joliet CD standard. Brasero supports multisessions, the Joliet extension and can create an image of the user's hard drive.

=== Audio ===
When creating audio CDs Brasero writes CD-TEXT information automatically found, using GStreamer. It also supports the editing of CD-TEXT information and can burn audio CDs on the fly. It can use all audio file formats handled by GStreamer local installation, including Ogg, FLAC and MP3. Brasero can also search for audio files that are inside dropped folders.

=== Copying ===
Brasero is capable of copying a CD/DVD to the user's hard drive in iso format and can copy DVDs and CDs on the fly. It supports single-session data DVDs and any type of CD.

=== Other features ===
Brasero can also erase CD/DVDs, save and load ongoing projects and can burn CD and DVD images and cue files.

It includes a song, image and video previewer using the GStreamer multimedia framework. When operating on a Linux kernel newer than 2.6.13 it provides file change notification.

When used with GDL, Brasero has a customizable user interface.

The application supports drag and drop as well as cut and paste from the Nautilus (GNOME file manager) and also other applications. It can use files from a network when the protocol is handled via GVfs. It can search for files using Tracker, allowing a search that is based on keywords or on file type. Brasero can also display a playlist and its contents. Playlists are automatically searched using Tracker.

== See also ==
- List of optical disc authoring software
