= Cdparanoia =

CD ripping software

cdparanoia
- Stable release: III 10.2 / September 11, 2008
- Operating system: Linux
- Type: CD ripper
- License: GNU General Public License
- Website: xiph.org/paranoia
- Repository: svn.xiph.org/trunk/cdparanoia/

cdparanoia is a command-line compact disc ripper for Unix-like operating systems and BeOS developed by Xiph.org. It is designed to be a minimalistic CD ripper which would compensate for sub-par hardware to produce an accurate rip.

libparanoia is a portable and platform-independent library which was made from important components from the Linux/gcc-only program cdparanoia. Libparanoia is part of the cdrtools suite.

== Design ==
libparanoia is the foundation of the project and does most of the work; the application cdparanoia is its frontend. (The current stable release of the library is Paranoia III.) cdparanoia is by design slow and thorough in ripping every bit from a CD, with the maximum number of default passes or reads being 20. A live output shows the progress and status denoted by emoticons. It can save the audio from discs as WAV, AIFF, AIFF-C, or raw format files.

Several programs provide a graphical frontend to cdparanoia itself, among them RubyRipper and Sound Juicer.

== Status indicators ==
One of the quirks of cdparanoia, in keeping with its minimalist design, is that the ripping status is indicated with an emoticon.

:-)        Normal operation, low/no jitter
:-|        Normal operation, considerable jitter
:-/        Read drift
:-P        Unreported loss of streaming in atomic read operation
8-|        Finding read problems at same point during re-read; hard to correct
:-0        SCSI/ATAPI transport error
:-(        Scratch detected
;-(        Gave up trying to perform a correction
8-X        Aborted read due to known, uncorrectable error
:^D        Finished extracting

== See also ==
- Compact disc digital audio
- Cdrtools
- cdrkit
- Exact Audio Copy
- Sound Juicer
