= Studio System by Gracenote =

American e-commerce company

- Type: Private
- Industry: E-commerce
- Founded: 1982
- Founders: James Monaco (Baseline); Jeffrey Lane (Brookfield Communications)
- Headquarters: Los Angeles, California, US
- Products: Studio System
- Services: Database subscriptions, business intelligence
- Owner: Gracenote
- Number of employees: 50
- Website: studiosystem.com

Studio System by Gracenote, formerly known as Baseline StudioSystems, is an American e-commerce company. It was founded in 1982 and licenses its commercial entertainment database, known as Studio System. It is owned by Gracenote, a subsidiary of Nielsen Holdings.

== History ==
James Monaco founded Baseline in 1982. Their primary product, an entertainment database, was launched in 1985. Monaco left Baseline in 1992, and Paul Kagan Associates purchased it the following year. Big Entertainment purchased the database in 1999 and subsequently renamed themselves to Hollywood.com. The same year, Creative Planet purchased The Studio System, a rival database founded in 1987, from Brookfield Communications. In 2004, Hollywood.com's parent company, Hollywood Media, purchased The Studio System and merged the two databases. Two years later, The New York Times Company purchased the now-renamed Baseline StudioSystems and integrated it into NYTimes.com, only to sell it back to Hollywood.com in 2011. Gracenote, a subsidiary of Tribune Media, purchased Baseline in 2014, citing a desire to better compete against competitor Rovi. Tribune sold the Gracenote subsidiary to Nielsen Holdings in 2017, including the Studio System.

== Database ==
Before its 2004 merge with the Studio System, the database was called Baseline. The combined database, now marketed under the Studio System name, includes information on films, television shows, filmographies, and box office data. After being purchased by Gracenote, it now includes their metadata from the former Tribune Media Services. It is subscription-based. Its data goes back to 1896 and includes works currently in production.

== See also ==
- AllMovie
- Internet Movie Database
