= Yahoo Music Jukebox =

Media player software developed by Yahoo! Inc.

Yahoo! Music Jukebox
- Other names: Yahoo! Music Engine
- Developer: Yahoo!
- Release: 2005; 21 years ago
- Final release: 2.2.2.058 / February 6, 2008; 18 years ago
- Preview release: none (n/a) [±]
- Operating system: Windows 98, Windows ME, Windows 2000, Windows XP, Windows Vista
- Type: Media player Music streaming service Online radio
- License: Proprietary
- Website: music.yahoo.com/jukebox

Yahoo! Music Jukebox, formerly known as Yahoo! Music Engine, was a freeware music player released by Yahoo! in 2005 to compete with iTunes and Rhapsody in the digital music market. Developed side-by-side with MusicMatch Jukebox, another music player acquired by Yahoo! in 2004, it was designed to be the main client for Yahoo's array of music services, which were centered around Yahoo! Music Unlimited, a paid music streaming service and digital music store; in addition to being a music management software. In early 2008, Yahoo! sold off its music assets, including Yahoo! Music Jukebox to RealNetworks' Rhapsody and replaced it with a web-based music player.

== History ==
The idea of a dedicated music player was born from Yahoo! audio search engine, which was divided into two segments: audio files openly found on the Web; and licensed music from Yahoo! own music service that can be searched by several criteria (e.g., artist, title, album, etc.) and downloaded for a price, typically $1 per track. Yahoo! wanted a product that would compete with Apple's iTunes and consequently acquired Mediacode —a digital music startup founded by former Nullsoft developers Ian Rogers and Robert Lord— in 2004 to build its in-house music subscription service and create a media player/digital jukebox as the main client for that service.

== Features ==
Its features include CD ripping and burning, access to LAUNCHcast radio and the Yahoo! Music Unlimited music subscription service, playlist creation, transfer of music to portable mp3 players and USB flash drives. The program allows Yahoo! Messenger users to stream music to one another (not to be confused with uploading and downloading or filesharing) and browse one another's playlists. Only those subscribed to Yahoo! Unlimited can add entire songs to their collections, however. Non-subscribers are limited to a thirty-second sample.

One can rip songs in a variety of formats including .wav, .mp3, and .wmv. One cannot rip songs in the .wma format, despite the fact that songs purchased from Yahoo! are encoded using that format. Another strange format issue within the player, the CD burner; it can burn .mp3 CD's, however, the player itself is incapable of playing an .mp3 CD.

The Engine also has a number of plugins available for free download from the program's official website below. The programming interfaces for the engine are open; anyone may create a plug-in or skin to modify the behavior of the engine.

Yahoo! strongly encourages users of MusicMatch Jukebox to upgrade to the latest version of Yahoo! Music Jukebox. The two products are relatively different in functionality. MusicMatch Jukebox has many more features, and it appears that Yahoo! Music Jukebox is a stripped-down version of the program it's superseded.

== System requirements ==
Yahoo! Music Jukebox (YMJ) requires Microsoft Windows XP with Service Pack 2 (32-Bit) or Microsoft Windows Vista (32 or 64-bit) with Internet Explorer 6 or newer and Windows Media Player 9 or newer. Also the computer must have at least a Pentium III 300 MHz processor & 128MB RAM. It currently does not support running on other operating systems. Due to its dependence on ActiveX, a proprietary technology developed by Microsoft, it is likely not to be ported to other operating systems.

== Shutdown ==
In February 2008, Yahoo! sold all its music assets to Rhapsody. All servers were switched off by end of September 2008. Left with no way to access their DRM-protected songs due to the shutdown of DRM validation servers, Yahoo! customers were offered a chance to download a DRM-free version of their existing files from Rhapsody.

As of summer 2008, the Jukebox no longer streams online content. The Jukebox may still be used to manage purchased music and local music, but no longer connects to any online services. If one wants to continue streaming Yahoo! Music, they should proceed to music.yahoo.com and listen to "My Station" from the website.

== See also ==
- MusicMatch Jukebox
- Songbird
- Comparison of video player software
