= Cdrkit =

Optical disc authoring software

cdrkit
- Developer: Debian Project
- Stable release: 1.1.11-5 / September 28, 2025; 7 months ago
- Operating system: Unix-like
- Type: CD/DVD-writing
- License: GPL version 2
- Website: tracker.debian.org/pkg/cdrkit
- Repository: salsa.debian.org/debian/cdrkit

cdrkit is a collection of computer programs for CD and DVD authoring that work on Unix-like systems. cdrkit is released under the GNU General Public License version 2. Fedora, Gentoo Linux, Mandriva Linux, and Ubuntu all include cdrkit. Joerg Jaspert is cdrkit's leader and release manager.

It was created in 2006 by Debian developers as a fork of cdrtools based on the last GPL-licensed version when cdrtools licensing changed.

Major components of cdrkit include:

- wodim (an acronym for write optical disk media), which was forked from the cdrecord program in cdrtools.
- icedax (an acronym for incredible digital audio extractor), which was forked from the cdda2wav program in cdrtools.
- genisoimage (short for "generate ISO image"), which was forked from the mkisofs program in cdrtools.

== Features ==
The cdrkit includes many features for CD and DVD writing, such as

- creation of audio, data, and mixed (audio and data) CDs
- burning CD-R, CD-RW, DVD-R.
- usage without root identity is possible in many cases, some device drivers still may fail, show unexplainable problems
- can use device node instead of SCSI ID numbers on Linux
- Creation of disc images with ISO9660, with optional Rock Ridge and Joliet extensions, and optionally with UDF 1.02 to support files beyond 4 GiB.
- genisoimage can calculate the size of a disk image without having to create one, using the -print-size option.
- Preservation of the last modified date and time attributes of files and folders, which can be seen in file managers. This applies if genisoimage or growisofs are invoked directly as a command line. Third-party tools such as k3b that invoke cdrkit might not preserve this attribute.

The -allow-limited-size option makes it possible to add files whose size exceeds 4 GiB (2^{32} bytes) using the Universal Disk Format (UDF) to an image (or a disc, if invoked from growisofs). It automatically enables -udf. However, the correct sizes of files exceeding 4 GiB are only represented in the UDF file tree, not in ISO9660, therefore such files are only fully accessible while the file system is mounted as UDF. When mounted as ISO9660, only the first 4 GiB of any file that exceeds this size are accessible. The ISO9660 feature that would allow for exceeding the 4 GiB size limitation using multiple entries with the same file name has not yet been implemented.

genisoimage is different from file archival utilities like tar in that it places the files and folders from the specified parent directory directly in the root directory of the disc image, not inside a directory with the name of the parent directory.

== Front-ends ==
Other software can use cdrkit tools in the back-end. cdrkit tools will maintain interface compatibility with cdrtools 2.01.01a08 at least for the near future. Numerous programs can therefore use it, including the growisofs command-line utility and graphical tools like Brasero (the default GNOME Desktop CD/DVD application), K3b (the default KDE desktop application), and X-CD-Roast (desktop environment independent).

== History ==
A license dispute arose between the Debian maintainers and the (since deceased) cdrtools author Jörg Schilling. The Debian developers said that the GPL license is not compatible with the CDDL license that covers part of the cdrtools code. In contrast, cdrtools maintainer Jörg Schilling stated that there is no problem with the license, and also felt that the Debian fork is not legally redistributable. The Red Hat legal team differed with Schilling's position, saying that he has not provided them with any proof of either license or copyright violation in cdrkit.

Schilling also said that the cdrkit fork reintroduced various bugs from the first versions of cdrtools, which were already fixed in later cdrtools versions. Debian developers considered that some of these changes were necessary to solve existing problems, rather than being bugs.
