= Audiograbber =

- Audiograbber 1.83 running on Windows XP
- Developer(s): Jackie Franck
- Stable release: 1.83 SE / August 24, 2004; 20 years ago
- Operating system: Microsoft Windows
- Type: CD ripper
- License: Adware
- Website: www.audiograbber.org

Audiograbber is a proprietary freeware CD audio extractor/converter program for Microsoft Windows. It was one of the first programs in the genre to become popular. The data extraction algorithm was designed by Jackie Franck and was included in the Xing Technology software package Xing Audio Catalyst in the mid-1990s.

It does not use Xing Technology's proprietary MP3 encoding library. Instead, it uses the LAME encoder, Ogg Vorbis encoder, WMA codec, as well as any format supported by an external command-line encoder library. The author is no longer developing this software.

Audiograbber is able to rip CDs, or record audio coming in via mic jack, or capture audio playing on the computer but not from the internet, into several formats, including WAV, MP3 and others. It performs the conversions entirely digitally, bypassing the system sound card, enabling accurate digital conversion. For convenience, it supports the freedb database of Compact Disc track listings (offline as of June 13, 2020), to allow ripped tracks, with reduced user effort, to have the names of songs, artists and albums. It also supports normalizing, ID3 tag and CD-Text support. A line-in sampling function can automatically split LP recordings into separate tracks, plus it can perform noise reduction with a proprietary VST plug-in from Algorithmix.

Prior to the release of version 1.83 in February 2004, Audiograbber was shareware. The unregistered versions of the software only allowed a random selection of half the tracks of a given CD to be extracted in each ripping session. These limitations in the software were due to a restrictive clause in an agreement between the author and Xing Technology. After the agreement expired, the software was made available as freeware with no limitations on its function.

Version 1.83 (as well as the convenient Lame plugin installer on the same site) from the developer site comes bundled with several adware like Funmoods Toolbar, Conduit Search, Zapp, VO Package, Browser Utility, AnyProtect. One has to read the installation screens carefully and deselect everything that one does not want to install.

In 2020, 1.83 (2020 Edition) was released, featuring integrated MP3 support, and it is configured to connect to the GnuDB.
