= Musicmatch Jukebox =

Audio player and manager software

MusicMatch Jukebox
- Other names: Yahoo! Music Musicmatch Jukebox
- Developers: MusicMatch, Inc.
- Release: 1997
- Final release: 10.00.4033 (August 2007)
- Operating system: Microsoft Windows; Mac OS
- Successor: Yahoo! Music Jukebox
- Type: Media player software
- License: Freemium
- Website: musicmatch.com (archived)

MusicMatch Jukebox was a media player software made by San Diego–based MusicMatch, Inc. It provided the ability to manage digital audio files and playlists, audio file conversion, an online music store, Internet radio, Compact Disc Digital Audio playback, CD ripper capabilities, and managing digital media on portable media players.

The company's Radio MX service allowed users to choose the artist they wanted to listen to but not the song.

== History ==
MusicMatch Jukebox was launched in 1997. MusicMatch Jukebox was bundled with the iPod Classic as its music manager until the introduction of iTunes for Microsoft Windows in 2003.

In September 2003, the company launched a digital music store with 200,000 songs available. The company entered into a partnership with Dell to promote the service and software.

In October 2004, Yahoo acquired Musicmatch for $160 million. However, the service was not integrated well, instead stagnating.

On August 31, 2007, Yahoo! discontinued MusicMatch services in an effort to move users to Yahoo! Music.

== Reception ==
AllGame gave Deluxe 6.0 a rating of 3.5 out of 5 and wrote: "Musicmatch Jukebox Deluxe 6.0 is a superb program for converting and listening to downloaded music files, but can be sluggish while surfing the 'net with a 56K connection."

== See also ==
- Comparison of audio player software
- Jukebox
- MP3
