= Exact Audio Copy =

CD ripping software

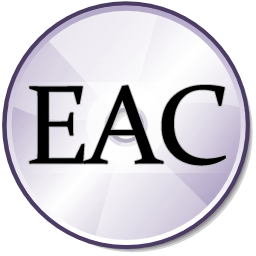
- Developer: Andre Wiethoff
- Release: 25 June 1998; 28 years ago
- Stable release: 1.8 (14 July 2024) [±]
- Written in: Modula-2 (with extensions in C++ and C#)
- Operating system: Windows XP to 11
- Size: 5.22 MiB (5.48 MB)
- Type: CD ripper
- License: Proprietary, freeware
- Website: www.exactaudiocopy.de

Exact Audio Copy (EAC) is an audio CD ripper program for Microsoft Windows. The program makes use of AccurateRip technology, that ensures ripped audio from each CD track matches the digital data on the CD. The program has been developed by Andre Wiethoff since 1998.

== Overview ==
Exact Audio Copy is proprietary freeware, and free for non-commercial use.

EAC is used to convert the tracks on standard audio CDs into WAV files, which can then be transcoded into other audio file formats using external command line-based audio encoders. These include: lossy audio file formats such as MP3, AAC, Ogg Vorbis, WMA; and lossless formats such as FLAC, ALAC, WavPack, Lossless WMA. EAC also includes AccurateRip, which verifies rips by comparing them to rips made by others.

== History ==
The program was created by Andre Wiethoff in 1998, while he was a student at the University of Dortmund in Germany. Wiethoff said that he became fed up with other audio CD ripping programs that only perform jitter correction — insufficient for many scratched CDs that are often ripped imperfectly — and decided to develop his own.

== See also ==
- Comparison of audio player software
- LAME - popular MP3 encoder, released the same year as Exact Audio Copy
- Ripping
