= Escient =

- Industry: Manufacturing
- Defunct: 2010
- Products: Consumer electronics

Escient was a division of D&M Holdings, which manufactured high-end, centralized, internet-connected home AV equipment. The Escient trademark was registered with the (now defunct) Digital Networks North America.

Escient's main product lines were movie managers, music managers, media players, and other peripherals. The FireBall brand provides up to a 750 GB hard drive for central music storage. It has the ability control as many as 2000 DVDs or CDs through a graphical user interface. Escient's home media servers are supplemented with networked digital remote players for whole-house audio.

The FireBall-PC software runs on Mac and Windows computers to share media collections throughout the home. The wireless web pad can browse the internet, stream audio from the FireBall web servers, access the FireBall servers remotely via 802.11b wireless networking, and replace the FireBall TV interface.

In April, 2010, D&M Holdings, Inc. discontinued the Escient brand.

== See also ==
- Gracenote
