= Gracenote =

American metadata company

Gracenote, Inc.

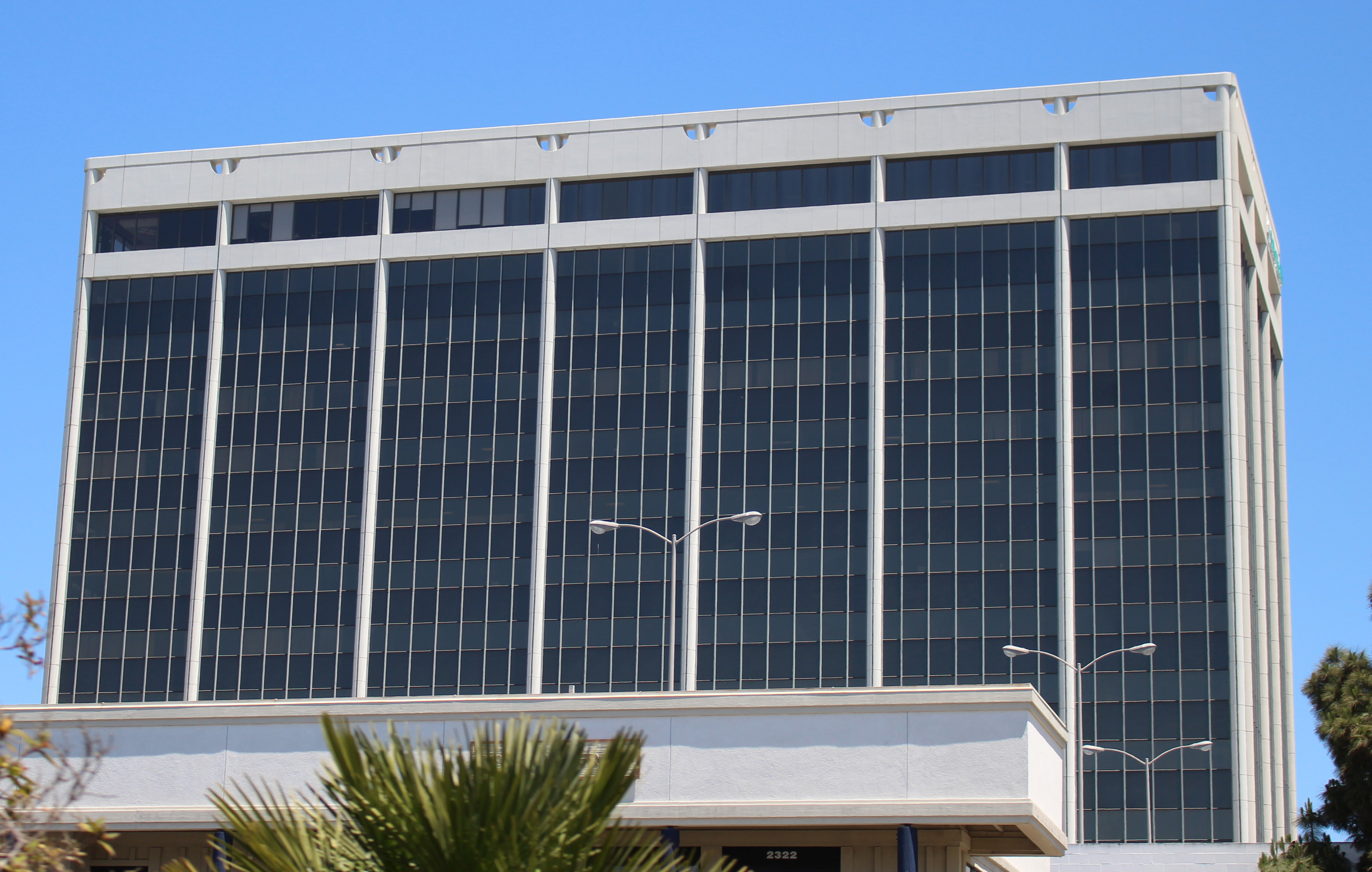
- Gracenote headquarters in Emeryville
- Formerly: Compact Disc Data Base (1998–2000)
- Type: Subsidiary
- Founded: October 5, 1998; 28 years ago
- Headquarters: Emeryville, California, United States
- Key people: Sujit Dasmunshi (General Manager); Tim Cutting (CRO); Trent Wheeler (CPO); Roger Rached (CTO)
- Products: Music Data; Video Data; Sports Data; Automatic Content Recognition (ACR) Technology; Digital Video Fingerprinting; Acoustic Fingerprinting
- Revenue: $98.76 million (2014)
- Number of employees: 1,700+ (2016)
- Parent: Sony Corporation of America (2008–2014); Tribune Media (2014–2017); Nielsen (2017–present)
- Website: www.gracenote.com

Gracenote, Inc. is a company and service that provides music, video, and sports metadata and automatic content recognition (ACR) technologies to entertainment services and companies worldwide. Formerly CDDB ("Compact Disc Data Base"), Gracenote maintains and licenses an Internet-accessible database containing information about the contents of audio compact discs and vinyl records. From 2008 to 2014, it was owned by Sony, later sold to Tribune Media, and has been owned since 2017 by Nielsen Holdings. In 2019, Nielsen Holdings announced plans to split into two separate publicly traded companies, Nielsen Global Connect (later known as NielsenIQ and sold) and Nielsen Global Media. In October 2022, Nielsen Holdings (by then consisting of the Global Media business), including the Gracenote subsidiary was acquired by a private equity consortium.

== History ==
Gracenote began in 1993 as an open-source project involving a CD player program named xmcd and an associated database named CDDB. xmcd and CDDB were created by Ti Kan and Steve Scherf. Because CDs do not contain any digitally-encoded information about their contents, Kan and Scherf devised a technology that identifies and looks up CDs based on TOC information stored at the beginning of each disc. A TOC, or Table of Contents, is a list of offsets corresponding to the start of each track on a CD. Its original database was created from and continues to receive voluntary contributions from users. This led to a licensing controversy when Gracenote became commercialized.

On April 22, 2008, Sony announced that it would acquire Gracenote for $260 million. The acquisition was completed on June 2, 2008.

On September 9, 2010, Gracenote received its one-billionth piece of data, with a submission about the Compact Disc release of Swans' My Father Will Guide Me Up a Rope to the Sky.

On December 23, 2013, Sony announced it would sell Gracenote to Tribune Media for $170 million. The acquisition closed in February 2014: Gracenote was aligned with the Tribune Media Services division which focused on TV and Movie metadata and IDs.

On June 12, 2014, Tribune Media Services merged with Gracenote to form one company under the Gracenote name.

On July 9, 2014, Tribune Media Company purchased What's-ON, a provider of TV data and advanced search offerings covering India and the Middle East for $27 million.

On September 3, 2014, Gracenote acquired Baseline, a Los Angeles–based provider of film and TV data and information. Baseline had previously been owned by the NY Times from 2006–2011 after which it was sold back to its original owners. This $50 million purchase deepened Gracenote's existing video datasets and added the Studio System database, a subscription-based resource for the Hollywood content creation and distribution communities, to its line-up of offerings.

On October 2, 2014, Gracenote purchased Australia-based TV and movie data company HWW for $19 million US to expand its Asia Pacific presence and international offerings.

On May 28, 2015, Gracenote acquired Amsterdam-based Infostrada Sports and Halifax-based SportsDirect, providers of music, video and sports data.

On December 20, 2016, Tribune Media announced that it was selling Gracenote to Nielsen Holdings for $540 million in cash. The deal officially closed on February 1, 2017. In September 2017, Gracenote partnered with Connekt and Ensequence to deliver real-time offers on smart TVs.

On November 7, 2019, Nielsen announced that it was splitting into two separate publicly traded companies. Gracenote fell under the company's Global Media business.

After divestiture of NielsenIQ (the former ACNielsen consumer research business) in 2021, Nielsen became solely a media audience measurement and analytics firm including Gracenote.

In October 2022, Nielsen and its subsidiaries (including Gracenote) were purchased by a private equity consortium led by affiliates of Elliott Investment Management and Brookfield Business Partners in an all-cash transaction valued at approximately $16 billion, including the assumption of debt.

== Products ==
Gracenote is known for MusicID, a music recognition software which identifies compact discs and delivers artist metadata and cover art to the desktop. The Gracenote database includes music genre and mood information, TV show descriptions, episode information, and channel line-ups, movie cast and crew information, and sports statistics and results. Companies including music services, TV providers, consumer electronics manufacturers and automakers use Gracenote data to power their content, universal search, navigation, linking, discovery and personalized recommendations abilities.

Gracenote's music recognition technologies compare digital music files to a worldwide database of music information, enabling digital audio devices to identify songs. The company licenses its technologies to developers of consumer electronics devices and online media players, who integrate the technologies into media players, home and car stereos, and digital music devices.

It provides software and metadata to businesses which enables their customers to manage and search digital media. Gracenote provides its media management technology and global media database of digital entertainment information to the mobile, automobile, portable, home, and PC markets. Several software applications which were capable of playing CDs (e.g. Media Go and iTunes,) used Gracenote's CDDB technology. Winamp, once a major licensee, no longer has access to Gracenote; the legacy media player program lost access to Gracenote when SHOUTcast and Winamp were sold by AOL in 2014. Redevelopment of Winamp continues by its new owner Radionomy who have said future Winamp versions will have access to an online music database.

In 2014 Tribune Media Company bought Gracenote from Sony Corporation of America. In December 2016, Tribune announced that it had reached an agreement to sell Gracenote to Nielsen Holdings for $560 million. The purchase was completed on February 1, 2017.

With the acquisition by Tribune Media in 2014 and subsequent acquisitions of What's-ON, HWW, Baseline, SportsDirect, and Infostrada Sports, Gracenote has expanded its core data product beyond music into video and sports.

Gracenote's early product line-up consisted of MusicID, Mobile MusicID, Music Enrichment, Discover, Playlist, Playlist Plus, Media VOCS, Classical Music Initiative, and Link. In April 2007, Gracenote launched the first legal lyrics offering in the U.S. that was sold to LyricFind in 2013.

Gracenote's music offerings fall into three major categories: Music Recognition, Music Data, and Music Discovery. Its music recognition product called MusicID was originally developed as a CD track-identification system. Gracenote also operates a digital file identification service that uses audio fingerprinting technology to identify digital music files such as MP3s and deliver track-level metadata, album art, and links to complementary content and services. Its music data offering provides information describing Genre, Mood, Era, Origin and Tempo for tens of millions of songs.

Gracenote Auto puts Automatic Content Recognition (ACR) technology into the car's audio system to identify music playing from various sources including AM/FM and satellite radio, CDs or streaming services and deliver relevant metadata and cover art. In December 2015, Gracenote launched its first audio technology, Gracenote Dynamic EQ, designed to help automakers and OEMs automatically tune connected car audio systems to the optimal equalizer settings for individual songs based on genre, mood and release date.

Gracenote's video platform called On Entertainment consists of TV listings and schedules for approximately 85 countries and 35 languages as well as TV and Movie data and related-imagery information for six million TV shows and movies. On Entertainment is supported by standardized TMS IDs for TV shows, movies, and celebrities. These IDs enable universal search across linear TV, OTT and VOD libraries and make possible "season pass" DVR recordings.

Gracenote Sports provides live scores, play-by-play data, historical results and records, schedules, player profiles, and athlete biographies for 4,500 leagues and competitions such as the NFL, MLB, NBA, NHL, Premier League, F1, Bundesliga, Tour de France, Wimbledon, and the Olympics. Gracenote's Podium product tracks all Olympic competition results and rankings at elite and junior levels as well as historical Olympic data going back to the very first modern games in 1896. In September 2015, the company announced DVR Extend which enables TV providers to dynamically adjust DVR settings to ensure live sports game recordings do not get cut off in the event they go past scheduled broadcast times.

== Customers ==
iTunes, Media Go, Sonicstage, Groove Music and Windows Media Player all use or have used Gracenote's CD track identification services. In addition, Gracenote provides or provided its products to a number of other services including online services like Yahoo! Music Jukebox, AOL, AmazonMP3, Spotify, Winamp, MetroLyrics, Pandora, Google Music; home and automotive products such as those from Alpine, Bose, or Panasonic; mobile music applications from Samsung and others, Sony Mobile Communication (TrackID, Sony Movies/Video & TV SideView App for Xperia Through Gracenote Video Explore and Sony Music Walkman App for Xperia), and the ACR technology into the car audio systems for Tesla, BMW, Nissan and several other car makers.

== Controversy ==
In 1998, CDDB was purchased by Escient, a consumer electronics manufacturer, and operated as a business unit within the American company. CDDB was then spun out of Escient and in July 2000 was renamed Gracenote. The CDDB database license was later changed to include new terms. For instance, any programs using a CDDB lookup had to display a CDDB logo while performing the lookup. Then, in March 2001, only licensed applications were provided access to the Gracenote database. New licenses for CDDB1 (the original version of CDDB) were no longer available, so programmers using Gracenote services were required to switch to CDDB2 (a new version incompatible with CDDB1).

This has been controversial, as the original CDDB database was created out of anonymous contributions, initially via the open source xmcd CD player program. Many listing contributors believed that the database was open-source as well because, in 1997, cddb.com's download and support pages had said it was released under the GPL. CDDB claims that the license grant was an error.

== See also ==
- List of online music databases
