= Compact Disc Digital Audio =

Data format used for audio compact discs

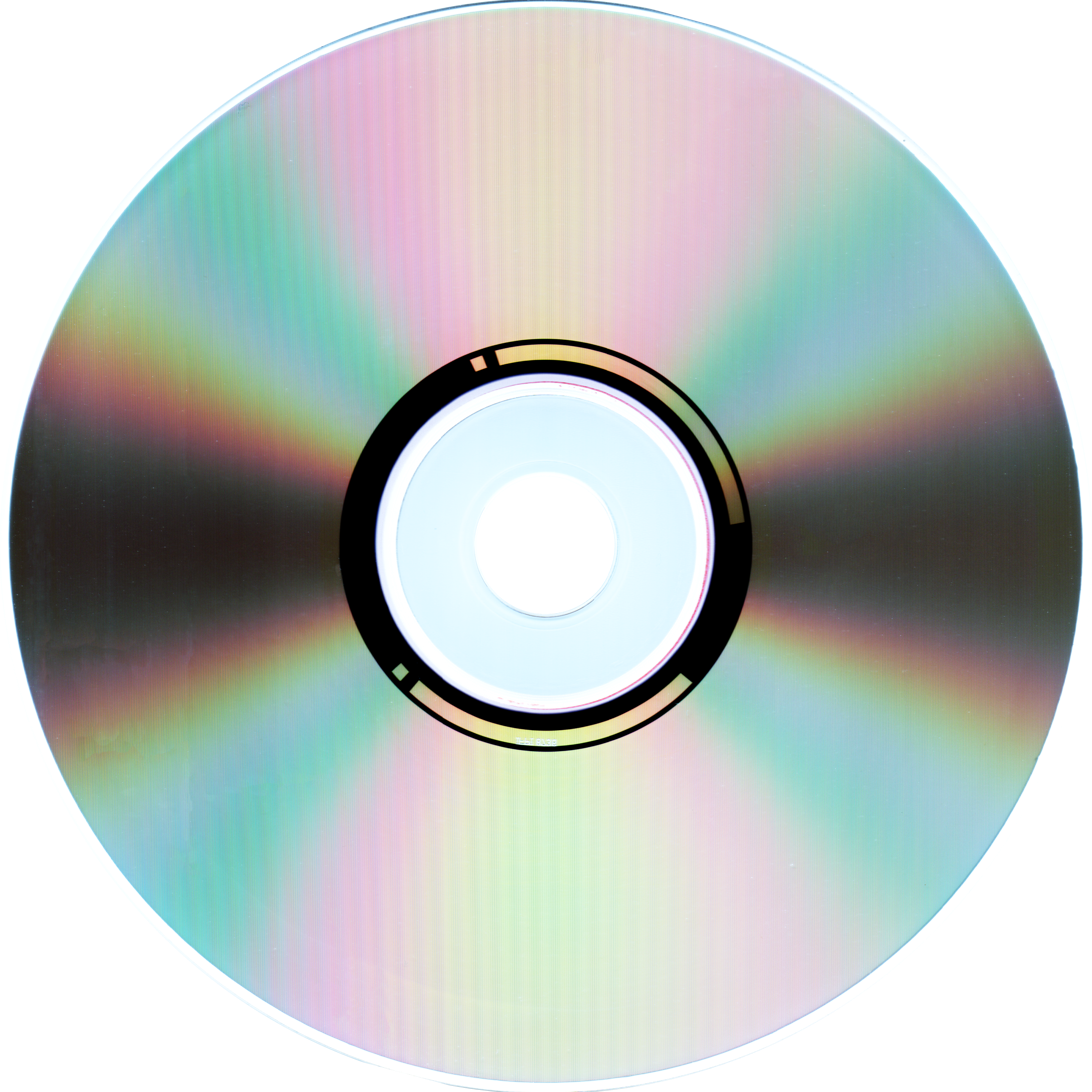
- Media type: Optical disc
- Encoding: 2 channels of LPCM audio, each signed 16-bit values sampled at 44100 Hz
- Capacity: 74–82 minutes
- Read mechanism: 780 nm laser diode
- Standard: Red Book/IEC 60908
- Developed by: Sony & Philips
- Usage: Audio storage
- Extended to: CD-Text · CD+G · DVD-Audio
- Released: 1982; 44 years ago

Compact Disc Digital Audio (CDDA or CD-DA), also known as Digital Audio Compact Disc or simply as Audio CD, is the standard format for audio compact discs. The standard is defined in the Red Book technical specifications, which is why the format is also dubbed "Redbook audio" in some contexts. CDDA utilizes pulse-code modulation (PCM) and uses a 44,100 Hz sampling frequency and 16-bit resolution, and was originally specified to store up to 74 minutes of stereo audio per disc.

The first commercially available audio CD player, the Sony CDP-101, was released in October 1982 in Japan. The format gained worldwide acceptance in 1983–84, selling more than a million CD players in its first two years, to play 22.5 million discs, before overtaking records and cassette tapes to become the dominant standard for commercial music. Peaking around the year 2000, sales of the audio CD declined over the next decade due to rising popularity and revenue from digital downloading, and during the 2010s by digital music streaming, but has remained as one of the primary distribution methods for the music industry. In the United States, phonograph record revenues surpassed the CD in 2020 for the first time since the 1980s, but in other major markets like Japan it remains the premier music format by a distance and in Germany it outsold other physical formats at least fourfold in 2022.

In the music industry, audio CDs have been generally sold as either a CD single (now largely dormant), or as full-length albums, the latter of which has been more commonplace since the 2000s. The format has also been influential in the progression of video game music, used in mixed mode CD-ROMs, providing CD-quality audio popularized during the 1990s on hardware such as PlayStation, Sega Saturn and personal computers with 16-bit sound cards like the Sound Blaster 16.

== History ==
The optophone, first presented in 1913, was an early device that used light for both recording and playback of sound signals on a transparent photograph. More than thirty years later, American inventor James T. Russell has been credited with inventing the first system to record digital media on a photosensitive plate. Russell's patent application was filed in 1966, and he was granted a patent in 1970. Following litigation, Sony and Philips licensed Russell's patents for recording in 1988. It is debatable whether Russell's concepts, patents, and prototypes instigated and in some measure influenced the compact disc's design.

The compact disc is an evolution of LaserDisc technology, where a focused laser beam is used that enables the high information density required for high-quality digital audio signals. Unlike the prior art by Optophonie and James Russell, the information on the disc is read from a reflective layer using a laser as a light source through a protective substrate. Prototypes were developed by Philips and Sony independently in the late 1970s. Although originally dismissed by Philips Research management as a trivial pursuit, the CD became the primary focus for Philips as the LaserDisc format struggled.

In 1979, Sony and Philips set up a joint task force of engineers to design a new digital audio disc. The group of experts analyzed every detail of the proposed CD system and met every two months alternating between Eindhoven and Tokyo for discussions. Each time, the experiments conducted were discussed and the best solution was chosen from the prototypes developed by Sony and Philips. After experimentation, the group decided to adopt Sony’s error correction system, CIRC. Immink, in a few months' time, developed the recording code called eight-to-fourteen modulation (EFM). EFM increases the playing time by more than 30% compared to the code used in the Philips prototype, without causing any issues with tracking. Sony and Philips decide to include EFM in the official Philips/Sony CD standard. EFM and Sony’s error correction code, CIRC are the only standard essential patents, (SEP)s, of the compact disc.

After a year of experimentation and discussion, the Red Book CD-DA standard was published in 1980. After their commercial release in 1982, compact discs and their players were extremely popular. Despite costing up to $1,000, over 400,000 CD players were sold in the United States between 1983 and 1984. By 1988, CD sales in the United States surpassed those of vinyl LPs, and, by 1992, CD sales surpassed those of prerecorded music-cassette tapes. The success of the compact disc has been credited to the cooperation between Philips and Sony, which together agreed upon and developed compatible hardware. The unified design of the compact disc allowed consumers to purchase any disc or player from any company and allowed the CD to dominate the at-home music market unchallenged.

=== Digital audio laser-disc prototypes ===
In 1974, Lou Ottens, director of the audio division of Philips, started a small group to develop an analog optical audio disc with a diameter of 20 cm (7.9 in) and a sound quality superior to that of the vinyl record. However, due to the unsatisfactory performance of the analog format, two Philips research engineers recommended a digital format in March 1974. In 1977, Philips then established a laboratory with the mission of creating a digital audio disc. The diameter of Philips's prototype compact disc was set at 11.5 cm (4.5 in), the diagonal of an audio cassette.

Heitaro Nakajima, who developed an early digital audio recorder within Japan's national public broadcasting organization, NHK, in 1970, became general manager of Sony's audio department in 1971. In 1973, his team developed a digital PCM adaptor that made audio recordings using a Betamax video recorder. After this, in 1974 the leap to storing digital audio on an optical disc was easily made. Sony first publicly demonstrated an optical digital audio disc in September 1976. A year later, in September 1977, Sony showed the press a 30 cm (12 in) disc that could play an hour of digital audio (44,100 Hz sampling rate and 16-bit resolution) using modified frequency modulation encoding.

In September 1978, Sony demonstrated an optical digital audio disc with a diameter of 30 cm (12 in) with a 150-minute playing time, 44,056 Hz sampling rate, 16-bit linear resolution, and cross-interleaved Reed-Solomon coding (CIRC) error correction code—specifications similar to those later settled upon for the standard compact disc format in 1980. Technical details of Sony's digital audio disc were presented during the 62nd AES Convention, held on 13–16 March 1979, in Brussels. Sony's AES technical paper was published on 1 March 1979. A week later, on 8 March, Philips publicly demonstrated a prototype of an optical digital audio disc at a press conference called "Philips Introduce Compact Disc" in Eindhoven, Netherlands. Sony executive Norio Ohga, later CEO and chairman of Sony, and Heitaro Nakajima were convinced of the format's commercial potential and pushed further development despite widespread skepticism.

=== Collaboration and standardization ===
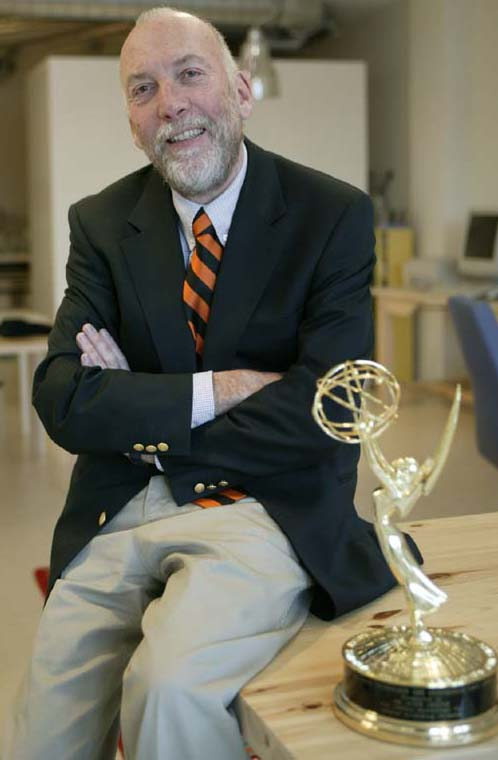
Dutch inventor and Philips chief engineer Kees Schouhamer Immink was part of the team that produced the standard compact disc in 1980

In 1979, Sony and Philips set up a joint task force of engineers to design a new digital audio disc. Led by engineers Kees Schouhamer Immink and Toshitada Doi, the research pushed forward laser and optical disc technology. After a year of experimentation and discussion, the task force produced the Red Book CD-DA standard. First published in 1980, the standard was formally adopted by the IEC as an international standard in 1987, with various amendments becoming part of the standard in 1996.

Philips coined the term compact disc in line with another audio product, the Compact Cassette, and contributed the general manufacturing process, based on video LaserDisc technology. Philips also contributed eight-to-fourteen modulation (EFM), while Sony contributed the error-correction method, CIRC, which offers resilience to defects such as scratches and fingerprints.

The Compact Disc Story, told by a former member of the task force, gives background information on the many technical decisions made, including the choice of the sampling frequency, playing time, and disc diameter. The task force consisted of around 6 persons, though according to Philips, the compact disc was "invented collectively by a large group of people working as a team".

=== Initial launch and adoption ===
Early milestones in the launch and adoption of the format included:

- The first test pressing was of a recording of Richard Strauss's An Alpine Symphony, recorded December 1–3, 1980 and played by the Berlin Philharmonic and conducted by Herbert von Karajan, who had been enlisted as an ambassador for the format in 1979.
- The world presentation took place during the Salzburg Easter Festival on 15 April 1981, at a press conference of Akio Morita and Norio Ohga (Sony), Joop van Tilburg (Philips), and Richard Busch (PolyGram), in the presence of Karajan who praised the new format.
- The first public demonstration was on the BBC television programme Tomorrow's World in 1981, when the Bee Gees' album Living Eyes (1981) was played.
- The first commercial compact disc was produced on 17 August 1982, a 1979 recording of Chopin waltzes performed by Claudio Arrau.
- The first 50 titles were released in Japan on 1 October 1982, the first of which was a re-release of Billy Joel's 1978 album 52nd Street.
- The first CD played on BBC Radio was in October 1982.
- The Japanese launch was followed on 14 March 1983 by the introduction of CD players and discs to Europe and North America where CBS Records released sixteen titles.

The first artist to sell a million copies on CD was Dire Straits, with their 1985 album Brothers in Arms. One of the first CD markets was devoted to reissuing popular music whose commercial potential was already proven. The first major artist to have their entire catalog converted to CD was David Bowie, whose first fourteen studio albums (up to Scary Monsters (and Super Creeps)) of (then) sixteen were made available by RCA Records in February 1985, along with four greatest hits albums; his fifteenth and sixteenth albums (Let's Dance and Tonight, respectively) had already been issued on CD by EMI Records in 1983 and 1984, respectively. On 26 February 1987, the first four UK albums by the Beatles were released in mono on compact disc.

The growing acceptance of the CD in 1983 marked the beginning of the popular digital audio revolution. It was enthusiastically received, especially in the early-adopting classical music and audiophile communities, and its handling quality received particular praise. As the price of players gradually came down, and with the introduction of the portable Discman, the CD began to gain popularity in the larger popular and rock music markets. With the rise in CD sales, pre-recorded cassette tape sales began to decline in the late 1980s; CD sales overtook cassette sales in the early 1990s. In 1988, 400 million CDs were manufactured by 50 pressing plants around the world.

=== Further development ===
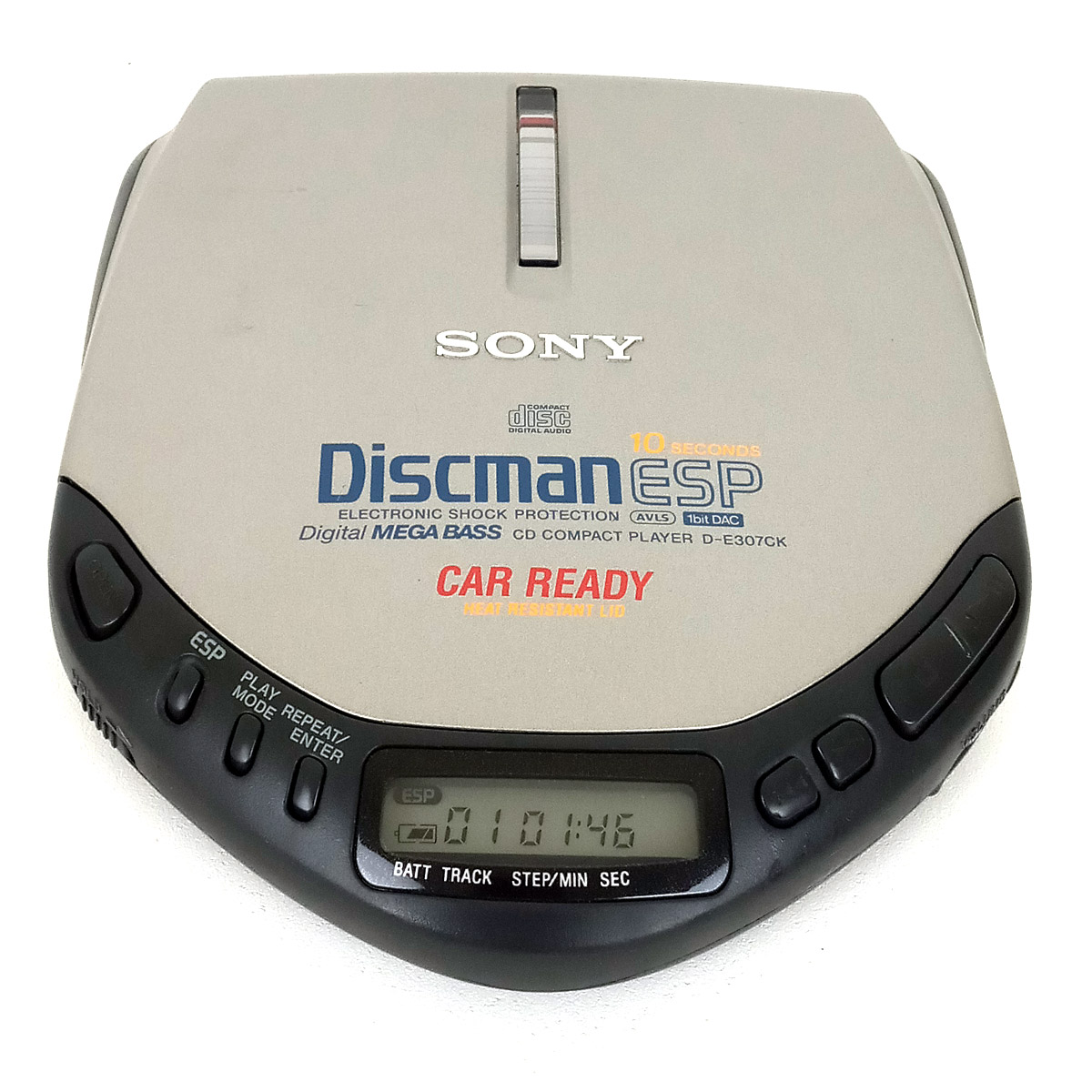
Sony Discman D-E307CK portable CD player with 1-bit DAC

Early CD players employed binary-weighted digital-to-analog converters (DAC), which contained individual electrical components for each bit of the DAC. Even when using high-precision components, this approach was prone to decoding errors. Another issue was jitter, a time-related defect. Confronted with the instability of DACs, manufacturers initially turned to increasing the number of bits in the DAC and using several DACs per audio channel, averaging their outputs. This increased the cost of CD players but did not solve the core problem.

A breakthrough in the late 1980s culminated in the development of the 1-bit DAC, which converts high-resolution low-frequency digital input signal into a lower-resolution high-frequency signal that is mapped to voltages and then smoothed with an analog filter. The temporary use of a lower-resolution signal simplified circuit design and improved efficiency, which is why it became dominant in CD players starting from the early 1990s. Philips used a variation of this technique called pulse-density modulation (PDM), while Matsushita (now Panasonic) chose pulse-width modulation (PWM), advertising it as MASH, which is an acronym derived from their patented Multi-stAge noiSe-sHaping PWM topology.

The CD was primarily planned as the successor to the vinyl record for playing music, rather than as a data storage medium. However, CDs have grown to encompass other applications. In 1983, following the CD's introduction, Immink and Joseph Braat presented the first experiments with erasable compact discs during the 73rd AES Convention. In June 1985, the computer-readable CD-ROM (read-only memory) and, in 1990, recordable CD-R discs were introduced. (Note: The world's first CD-R was made by the Japanese firm Taiyo Yuden Co., Ltd. in 1988 as part of the joint Philips-Sony development effort.) Recordable CDs became an alternative to tape for recording and distributing music and could be duplicated without degradation in sound quality.

Other newer video formats, such as DVD and Blu-ray, use the same physical geometry as CD, and most DVD and Blu-ray players are backward compatible with audio CDs.

=== Peak ===
CD sales in the United States peaked by 2000. By the early 2000s, the CD player had largely replaced the audio cassette player as standard equipment in new automobiles, with 2010 being the final model year for any car in the United States to have a factory-equipped cassette player.

Two new formats were marketed in the 2000s, designed as successors to the CD: the Super Audio CD (SACD) and DVD-Audio. However, neither of these was adopted, partly due to the increased popularity of music downloads and the apparent lack of audible improvements in audio quality to most human ears. These effectively extended the CD's longevity in the music market.

=== Decline ===
With the advent and popularity of Internet-based distribution of files in lossy-compressed audio formats such as MP3, sales of CDs began to decline in the 2000s. For example, between 2000 and 2008, despite overall growth in music sales and one anomalous year of increase, major-label CD sales declined overall by 20%. Despite rapidly declining sales year-over-year, the pervasiveness of the technology lingered for a time, with companies placing CDs in pharmacies, supermarkets, and filling station convenience stores to target buyers less likely to be able to use Internet-based distribution.

In 2012, CDs and DVDs made up only 34% of music sales in the United States. By 2015, only 24% of music in the United States was purchased on physical media, two thirds of this consisting of CDs; however, in the same year in Japan, over 80% of music was bought on CDs and other physical formats. In 2018, U.S. CD sales were 52 million units—less than 6% of the peak sales volume in 2000. In the UK, 32 million units were sold, almost 100 million fewer than in 2008. In 2018, Best Buy announced plans to decrease their focus on CD sales, however, while continuing to sell records, sales of which are growing during the vinyl revival.

During the 2010s, the increasing popularity of solid-state media and music streaming services caused automakers to remove automotive CD players in favor of minijack auxiliary inputs, wired connections to USB devices and wireless Bluetooth connections. Automakers viewed CD players as using up valuable space and taking up weight, which could be reallocated to more popular features, like large touchscreens. By 2021, only Lexus and General Motors were still including CD players as standard equipment with certain vehicles.

=== Current status ===
CDs continued to be strong in some markets such as Japan where 132 million units were produced in 2019.

The decline in CD sales has slowed in recent years; in 2021, CD sales increased in the US for the first time since 2004, with Axios citing its rise to "young people who are finding they like hard copies of music in the digital age". It came at the same time as both vinyl and cassette reached sales levels not seen in 30 years. The RIAA reported that CD revenue made a dip in 2022, before increasing again in 2023 and overtook downloading for the first time in over a decade.

In the US, 33.4 million CD albums were sold in the year 2022. In France in 2023, 10.5 million CDs were sold, almost double that of vinyl. CDs and vinyl each represented 12% of French music industry revenue.

=== Awards and accolades ===
Sony and Philips received praise for the development of the compact disc from professional organizations. These awards include:

- Technical Grammy Award for Sony and Philips, 1998.
- IEEE Milestone award, 2009, for Philips alone with the citation: "On 8 March 1979, N.V. Philips' Gloeilampenfabrieken demonstrated for the international press a Compact Disc Audio Player. The demonstration showed that it is possible by using digital optical recording and playback to reproduce audio signals with superb stereo quality. This research at Philips established the technical standard for digital optical recording systems."

== Standard ==
The Red Book specifies the physical parameters and properties of the CD, the optical parameters, deviations and error rate, modulation system (eight-to-fourteen modulation, EFM) and error correction facility (CIRC), and the eight subcode channels. These parameters are common to all compact discs and used by all logical formats: audio CD, CD-ROM, etc. The standard also specifies the form of digital audio encoding.

The first edition of the Red Book was released in 1980 by Philips and Sony; it was adopted by the Digital Audio Disc Committee and ratified by the International Electrotechnical Commission (IEC) Technical Committee 100 as an international standard in 1987 with the reference IEC 60908. The second edition of IEC 60908 was published in 1999 and it replaces the first edition, amendment 1 (1992) and the corrigendum to amendment 1. The IEC 60908 however does not contain all the information for extensions that is available in the Red Book, such as the details for CD-Text, CD+G and CD+EG. The standard is not freely available and must be purchased from the IEC.

== Audio format ==
The audio contained in a CD-DA consists of two-channel signed 16-bit LPCM sampled at 44,100 Hz and written as a little-endian interleaved stream with left channel coming first.

The sampling rate is adapted from that attained when recording digital audio on videotape with a PCM adaptor, an earlier way of storing digital audio. An audio CD can technically represent frequencies up to 22.05 kHz, the Nyquist frequency of the 44.1 kHz sample rate, although in practice an upper frequency limit of 20 kHz is specified in order to leave a transition band for the required low-pass anti-aliasing filter.

There was a long debate over the use of 16-bit (Sony) or 14-bit (Philips) quantization, and 44,056 or 44,100 samples/s (Sony) or approximately 44,000 samples/s (Philips). When the Sony/Philips task force designed the Compact Disc, Philips had already developed a 14-bit D/A converter (DAC), but Sony insisted on 16-bit. In the end Sony won, so 16 bits and 44.1 kilosamples per second prevailed. Philips found a way to produce 16-bit quality using its 14-bit DAC by using four times oversampling.

Some early CDs were mastered with pre-emphasis, an artificial boost of high audio frequencies. The pre-emphasis improves the apparent signal-to-noise ratio by making better use of the channel's dynamic range. On playback, the player applies a de-emphasis filter to restore the frequency response curve to an overall flat one. Pre-emphasis time constants are 50 μs and 15 μs (9.49 dB boost at 20 kHz), and a binary flag in the disc subcode instructs the player to apply de-emphasis filtering if appropriate. Playback of such discs in a computer or ripping to WAV files typically does not take into account the pre-emphasis, so such files play back with an incorrect frequency response. FFmpeg has a filter to remove (or apply) the pre-emphasis in order to create standard WAV files, or to create CDs with pre-emphasis.

Four-channel, or quadraphonic, support was originally intended to be included in CD-DA. The Red Book specification briefly mentioned a four-channel mode in its June 1980, September 1983, and November 1991 editions. On the first page, it lays out the "Main parameters" of the CD system, including: "Number of channels: 2 and/or 4 simultaneously[*] sampled." The footnote says, "In the case of more than two channels the encoder and decoder diagrams have to be adapted."

In reality, however, the underspecified "four-channel" mode was dropped from the CD standard when it was adopted by the International Electrotechnical Commission and became IEC 908:1987, and later IEC 60908:1999. Since the behavior of the "four-channel" or "Broadcasting use" bit was never specified by either CD standard, no mass-marketed discs have attempted to use the Red Book's four-channel mode, and no players have purported to implement it.

== Storage capacity and playing time ==
The creators of the CD originally aimed at a playing time of 60 minutes with a disc diameter of 100 mm (Sony) or 115 mm (Philips). Sony vice-president Norio Ohga suggested extending the capacity to 74 minutes and 33 seconds to accommodate the recording of Wilhelm Furtwängler conducting Ludwig van Beethoven's Ninth Symphony at the 1951 Bayreuth Festival. The additional 14-minute playing time required increasing disc diameter. Kees Schouhamer Immink, Philips' chief engineer, however, denies this, claiming that the increase was motivated by technical considerations and that even after the increase in size, the Furtwängler recording would not have fit onto one of the earliest CDs.

According to a Sunday Tribune interview, the story is slightly more involved. In 1979, Philips owned PolyGram, one of the world's largest music distributors. PolyGram had set up a large experimental CD plant in Hannover, Germany, which could produce huge numbers of CDs having a diameter of 115 mm. Sony did not yet have such a facility. If Sony had agreed on the 115-mm disc, Philips would have had a significant competitive edge in the market. The long playing time of Beethoven's Ninth Symphony imposed by Ohga was used to push Philips to accept 120 mm, so that Philips' PolyGram lost its edge on disc fabrication.

The 74:33 playing time of a CD, which is longer than the 22 minutes per side typical of long-playing (LP) vinyl albums, was often used to the CD's advantage during the early years when CDs and LPs vied for commercial sales. CDs would often be released with one or more bonus tracks, enticing consumers to buy the CD for the extra material. However, attempts to combine double LPs onto one CD occasionally resulted in the opposite situation in which the CD would instead offer less audio than the LP. One such example was with DJ Jazzy Jeff & The Fresh Prince's double album He's the DJ, I'm the Rapper, in which initial CD releases of the album had multiple tracks edited down for length to fit on a single disc; recent CD reissues package the album across two discs as a result. Furthermore, early CD releases were restricted by the 72-minute limit of 3/4 inch U-matic tapes used by early PCM adaptors; by 1988, higher-capacity alternatives would arrive on the market, allowing for releases to make use of the full 74:33. This and the emergence of 80-minute CDs allowed for some double albums that were previously edited for length, e.g. 1999 by Prince, or packaged as double CDs, e.g. Tommy by the Who, to be re-released on a single disc.

Playing times beyond 74:33 are achieved by decreasing track pitch (the distance separating the track as it spirals the disc). However, most players can still accommodate the more closely spaced data if it is still within Red Book tolerances. Manufacturing processes used in the final years of CD technology allowed an audio CD to contain up to 82 minutes (variable from one replication plant to another) without requiring the content creator to sign a waiver releasing the plant owner from responsibility if the CD produced is marginally or entirely unreadable by some playback equipment. In this final practice, maximum CD playing time crept higher by reducing minimum engineering tolerances.

Progression in the maximum duration of released audio CDs
Released	Time	Title	Artist	Label
1980	50:47	Richard Strauss: Eine Alpensinfonie	Berlin Philharmonic Orchestra / Herbert von Karajan	None. This was the first test pressing of a CD. Later sold commercially by Deutsche Grammophon.
1988	80:08	Mission of Burma (compilation)	Mission of Burma	Rykodisc
1990	80:51	Late Romantic Masterworks	Andrew Fletcher	Mirabilis Records
1990	82:04	JS Bach, Das Orgelbüchlein	Richard Marlow	Mirabilis Records
2004	82:34	Bruckner's Fifth (live)	Munich Philharmonic cond. Christian Thielemann	Deutsche Grammophon/Universal Classics 477 5377
2005	82:34	Sergey Tanyiev works for piano and ensemble	Vadim Repin, Ilya Gringolts, Nobuko Imai, Lynn Harrell, and Mikhail Pletnev	Deutsche Grammophon/Universal Classics 477 5419
2006	88:41 on disc 1, 89:07 on disc 2	Bäst of	Die Ärzte	Hot Action/Universal 930 003
2014	85:16	Chopin & Schumann Etudes	Valentina Lisitsa	Decca/Universal Classics 478 7697
2014	85:10 and 85:57	So80s Presents Alphaville	Alphaville (curated by Blank & Jones)	Soulfood
2016	86:30	Mozart Violin Concertos (Mozart 225 Boxed Set, CD75)	Various Artists	Deutsche Grammophon/Universal Classics 478 9864
2026	92:02	Fancy Some More?	PinkPantheress and various collaborators	Warner Music Group

== Technical specifications ==
=== Data encoding ===
Each audio sample is a signed 16-bit two's complement integer, which has sample values ranging from −32768 to +32767. The source audio data is divided into frames, containing twelve samples each (six left and six right samples, alternating), for a total of 192 bits (24 bytes) of audio data per frame.

This stream of audio frames is then subjected to CIRC encoding, which segments and rearranges the data and expands it with error correction codes in a way that allows occasional read errors to be detected and corrected. CIRC encoding interleaves the audio frames throughout the disc over several consecutive frames so that the information will be more resistant to burst errors. Therefore, a physical frame on the disc will actually contain information from multiple logical audio frames. This process adds 64 bits of error correction codes to each frame. After this, 8 bits of subcode data are added to each of these encoded frames, which is used for control and addressing when playing the CD.

CIRC encoding plus the subcode byte generates 33-byte long frames, called channel-data frames. These frames are then modulated through eight-to-fourteen modulation (EFM), where each 8-bit byte is replaced with a corresponding 14-bit word designed to reduce the number of transitions between 0 and 1. This reduces the density of physical pits on the disc and provides an additional degree of error tolerance. Three merging bits are added before each 14-bit word for disambiguation and synchronization. In total, there are 33 × (14 + 3) = 561 bits. A 27-bit word (a 24-bit pattern plus 3 merging bits) is added to the beginning of each frame to assist with synchronization, so the reading device can locate frames easily. With this, a frame ends up containing 588 bits of channel data which are decoded to 192 bits of digital audio.

The frames of channel data are finally written to disc physically in the form of pits and lands, with each pit or land representing a series of zeroes, and with the transition points—the edge of each pit—representing a 1. A Red Book-compatible CD-R has pit-and-land-shaped spots on a layer of organic dye instead of actual pits and lands; a laser creates the spots by altering the reflective properties of the dye.

Due to the weaker error correction sector structure used on audio CDs and video CDs (Mode 2 Form 2) than on data discs (Mode 1 or Mode 2 Form 1), C2 errors are not correctable and signify data loss. Even with uncorrectable errors, a compact disc player uses error concealment with the aim of making the damage unhearable.

=== Data structure ===
Some of the visible features of an audio CD, including the lead-in, program area, and lead-out. A microscopic spiral of digital information begins near the disc's center and progresses toward the edge.

The audio data stream in an audio CD is continuous but has three parts. The main portion, further divided into playable audio tracks, is the program area. This section is preceded by a lead-in track and followed by a lead-out track. The lead-in and lead-out tracks encode only silent audio, but all three sections contain subcode data streams.

The lead-in's subcode contains repeated copies of the disc's table of contents (TOC), which provides an index of the start positions of the tracks in the program area and of the lead-out. The track positions are referenced by absolute timecode, relative to the start of the program area, in MSF format: minutes, seconds, and fractional seconds called frames. Each timecode frame is one seventy-fifth of a second, and corresponds to a block of 98 channel-data frames—ultimately, a block of 588 pairs of left and right audio samples. Timecode contained in the subchannel data allows the reading device to locate the region of the disc that corresponds to the timecode in the TOC. The TOC on discs is analogous to the partition table on hard drives. Nonstandard or corrupted TOC records are abused as a form of CD/DVD copy protection, in e.g., the key2Audio scheme.

==== Tracks ====
The largest entity on a CD is called a track. A CD can contain up to 99 tracks (including a data track for mixed mode discs). Each track can in turn have up to 100 indexes, though players that still support this feature have become rarer over time. The vast majority of songs are recorded under index 1, with the pregap being index 0. Sometimes hidden tracks are placed at the end of the last track of the disc, often using index 2 or 3, or using the pregap as index 0 (this latter usage will result in the track playing as the time counter counts down to time 0:00 at the start of the track, index 1.) This is also the case with some discs offering "101 sound effects", with 100 and 101 being indexed as two and three on track 99. The index, if used, is occasionally put on the track listing as a decimal part of the track number, such as 99.2 or 99.3. (Note: Information Society's Hack was one of very few CD releases to do this, following a release with an equally obscure CD+G feature.) The track and index structure of the CD were carried forward to the DVD format as title and chapter, respectively.

Tracks, in turn, are divided into timecode frames, which are further subdivided into channel-data frames.

==== Frames and timecode frames ====
The smallest entity in a CD is a channel-data frame, which consists of 33 bytes and contains six complete 16-bit stereo samples: 24 bytes for the audio (two bytes × two channels × six samples = 24 bytes), eight CIRC error-correction bytes, and one subcode byte. As described in § Data encoding, after the EFM modulation the number of bits in a frame totals 588.

On a Red Book audio CD, data is addressed using the MSF scheme, with timecodes expressed in minutes, seconds and another type of frames (mm:ss:ff), where one frame corresponds to 1/75th of a second of audio: 588 pairs of left and right samples. This timecode frame is distinct from the 33-byte channel-data frame described above, and is used for time display and positioning the reading laser. When editing and extracting CD audio, this timecode frame is the smallest addressable time interval for an audio CD; thus, track boundaries only occur on these frame boundaries. Each of these structures contains 98 channel-data frames, totaling 98 × 24 = 2,352 bytes of music. The CD is played at a speed of 75 frames per second, 44,100 samples and 176,400 bytes per second.

In the 1990s, CD-ROM and related digital audio extraction (DAE) technology introduced the term sector to refer to each timecode frame, with each sector being identified by a sequential integer starting at zero, and with tracks aligned on sector boundaries. An audio CD sector corresponds to 2,352 bytes of decoded data. The Red Book does not refer to sectors, nor does it distinguish the corresponding sections of the disc's data stream except as frames in the MSF addressing scheme.

The following table shows the relation between tracks, timecode frames (sectors) and channel-data frames:

Track level	Track N				
Timecode frame and sector level	Timecode frame and sector 1 (2,352 B of data)			Timecode frame and sector 2 (2,352 B of data)	...
Channel-data frame level	Channel-data frame 1 (24 B of data)	...	Channel-data frame 98 (24 B of data)	...	...

=== Bit rate ===
The audio bit rate for a Red Book audio CD is 1,411,200 bits per second (1,411 kbit/s) or 176,400 bytes per second; 2 channels × 44,100 samples per second per channel × 16 bits per sample. Audio data coming in from a CD is contained in sectors, each sector being 2,352 bytes, and with 75 sectors representing 1 second of audio. For comparison, the bit rate of an original speed CD-ROM is 2,048 bytes per sector × 75 sectors per second = 153,600 bytes per second. The remaining 304 bytes in a CD-ROM sector are used for additional data error correction.

=== Data access from computers ===
Unlike on a DVD or CD-ROM, there are no files on a Red Book audio CD; there is only one continuous stream of LPCM audio data, and a parallel, smaller set of 8 subcode data streams. Computer operating systems, however, may provide access to an audio CD as if it contains files. For example, Windows represents the CD's table of contents as a set of Compact Disc Audio track (CDA) files, each file containing indexing information, not audio data. By contrast however, Finder on macOS presents the CD's content as an actual set of files, with the AIFF-extension, which can be copied directly, randomly and individually by track as if it were actual files. In reality, macOS performs rips as needed in the background, transparent to the user. The copied tracks are fully playable and editable on the user's computer.

In a process called ripping, digital audio extraction software can be used to read CD-DA audio data and store it in files. Common audio file formats for this purpose include WAV and AIFF, which simply preface the LPCM data with a short header; FLAC, ALAC, and Windows Media Audio Lossless, which compress the LPCM data in ways that conserve space yet allow it to be restored without any changes; and various lossy, perceptual coding formats like MP3, AAC, and Opus, compress the audio data to a greater degree in ways that irreversibly change the audio, but that exploit features of human hearing to make the changes difficult to discern.

== Format variations ==
Recording publishers have created CDs that violate the Red Book standard. Some do so for the purpose of copy protection, using systems like Copy Control. Some do so for extra features such as DualDisc, which includes both a CD layer and a DVD layer in which the CD layer is thinner, 0.9 mm, than required by the Red Book, which stipulates a nominal 1.2 mm, but at least 1.1 mm. Philips and many other companies have stated that including the Compact Disc Digital Audio logo on such non-conforming discs may constitute trademark infringement.

Super Audio CD was a standard published in 1999 that aimed to provide better audio quality than CDs. DVD-Audio emerged at around the same time. Both formats were designed to use a higher sampling rate and DVD media. Neither format was widely accepted.

== Copyright issues ==
There have been moves by the recording industry to make audio CDs (Compact Disc Digital Audio) unplayable on computer CD-ROM drives, to prevent the copying of music. This is done by intentionally introducing errors onto the disc that the embedded circuits on most stand-alone audio players can automatically compensate for, but which may confuse CD-ROM drives. Consumer rights advocates as of October 2001 pushed to require warning labels on compact discs that do not conform to the official Compact Disc Digital Audio standard (often called the Red Book) to inform consumers which discs do not permit full fair use of their content.

In 2005, Sony BMG Music Entertainment was criticized when a copy protection mechanism known as Extended Copy Protection (XCP) used on some of their audio CDs automatically and surreptitiously installed copy-prevention software on computers (see Sony BMG copy protection rootkit scandal). Such discs are not legally allowed to be called CDs or Compact Discs because they break the Red Book standard governing CDs, and Amazon.com for example describes them as "copy protected discs" rather than "compact discs" or "CDs".

== See also ==
- Digital rights management
- Gapless playback
