= DeCSS haiku =

Poem that describes the DeCSS algorithm

DeCSS haiku is a 465-stanza haiku poem written in 2001 by American hacker Seth Schoen as part of the protest action regarding the prosecution of Norwegian programmer Jon Lech Johansen for co-creating the DeCSS software. The poem, written in the spirit of civil disobedience against the DVD Copy Control Association, argues that "code is speech."

== History ==
DeCSS haiku was created in the context of a series of protests, coming from the international hacker community, against the arrest of Norwegian programmer Jon Lech Johansen, and a series of related lawsuits against him and other hackers (such as Universal City Studios, Inc. v. Reimerdes and DVD Copy Control Association, Inc. v. Bunner). Johansen, a Norwegian teenage programmer, was one of the creators of the freely distributed DeCSS software which can be used to bypass DVD encryption, preventing even legally-acquired DVDs from running on unauthorized computers (which at that time included all Linux machines). Johansen and others who reposted the code, including 2600: The Hacker Quarterly, were sued by the entertainment industry for revealing a trade secret and facilitating illegal copying and distribution of content on said DVDs.

Seth Schoen's goal was to provide tangible proof for the argument that "source code is speech" and hence should be given the same legal protections as free speech. A number of other activists, in the spirit of civil disobedience, created works of art containing the infringing code, on the principle that such works are subject to First Amendment principle within the United States. Schoen decided to create a poem, which he did in 2001. At first, Schoen released the poem anonymously, though he has publicly acknowledged its ownership since.

== Overview ==
The 465-stanza haiku begins with a copyright waiver, putting the poem into the public domain:

(I abandon my
exclusive rights to make or
perform copies of

this work, U. S. Code
Title Seventeen, section
One Hundred and Six.)

The haiku then transcodes the DeCSS software, in effect allowing most computer programmers to recreate the DeCSS software from scratch, using the haiku as their only reference. This can be illustrated by the following short excerpt:

All we have to do
is this: copy our DKEY
into im1,

use the rule above
that decrypts a disk key (with
im1 and its

friend im2 as
inputs) -- thus we decrypt the
disk key im1.

At another point, the poem discloses a sixteen-digit master key to the CSS code that the entertainment industry lawyers considered a proprietary trade secret:

So this number is,
once again, the player key:
(trade secret haiku?)

Eighty-one; and then
one hundred three -- two times; then
two hundred (less three)

two hundred twenty
four; and last (of course not least)
the humble zero.

Gabriella Coleman noted: "in formally comparing code to poetry in the medium of a poem, Schoen displays a playful form of clever and recursive rhetoric valued among hackers; he also articulates the meaning of the First Amendment and software." David S. Touretzky in turn described this work as "ingenious poem... both a commentary on the DeCSS situation and a correct and complete description of the descrambling algorithm. Truly inspired."

His work has been described as one of the most notable examples of DeCSS-inspired hacker art. It was covered by The Wall Street Journal, San Francisco Chronicle, Wired, and The New York Times Magazine.

== Seth Schoen ==
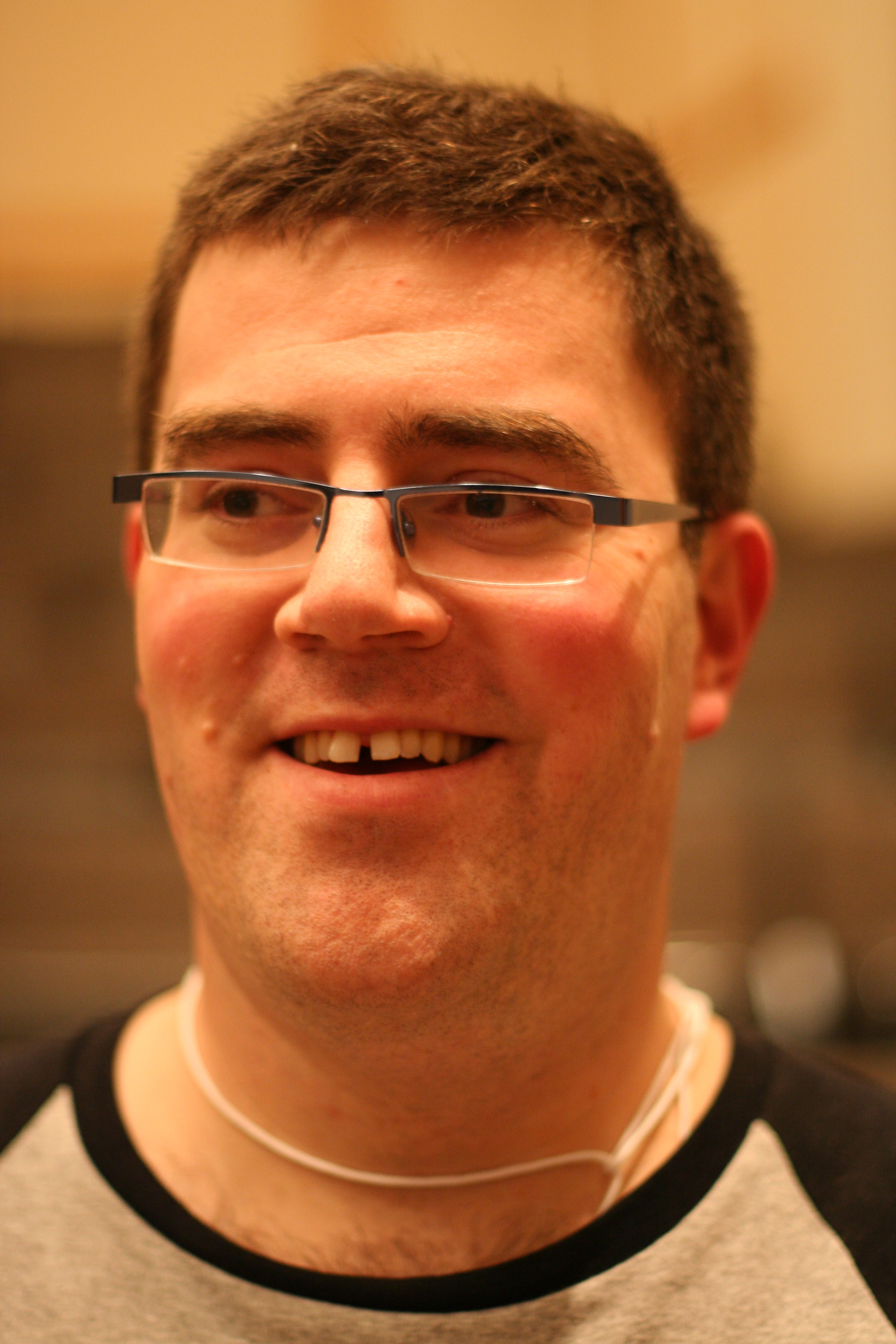
Seth Schoen at the 2012 Mystery Hunt

Seth David Schoen (born September 27, 1979) is senior staff technologist for the Electronic Frontier Foundation, a technology civil rights organisation, and has been actively involved in discussing digital copyright law and encryption since the 1990s. He is an expert in trusted computing, and is best known as the author of DeCSS haiku.

Seth attended Northfield Mount Hermon School in Northfield, Massachusetts from 1993–1997. While attending UC Berkeley, Schoen founded Californians for Academic Freedom to protest the loyalty oath the state made university employees swear. Schoen later worked for Linuxcare, where he developed the Linuxcare Bootable Business Card. After he left Linuxcare, he forked the project to create the LNX-BBC rescue system, of which he is a lead developer. Schoen was formerly a board member and the Secretary of the Peer-Directed Projects Center, a Texas-based non-profit corporation, until he stepped down in November 2006.

=== Other work ===
In February 2008, Schoen collaborated with a Princeton research group led by Edward Felten that discovered a vulnerability of DRAM that undermined the basic assumptions of computer encryption security. In October 2005, Schoen led a small research team at EFF to decode the tiny tracking dots hidden in the printouts of some laser printers.

== See also ==
- AACS encryption key controversy
- libdvdcss
