= Qflix =

DVD copy prtection system

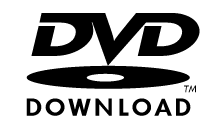
DVD-Download logo

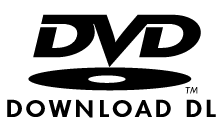
DVD-Download logo for Dual Layer discs

Qflix is a proprietary technology developed and licensed by Sonic Solutions and Pioneer Corporation to add Content Scramble System (CSS) to recordable DVD-R discs.

Qflix is an implementation of the DVD Forum's DVD-Download specification (DVD Download Disc for CSS Managed Recording), including extensions to the optical drive command set defined by the Mt. Fuji group of the IT industry. Sonic hopes to establish Qflix as a standard for recordable CSS and charge royalties for its use.

Recordable CSS (also known as CSS Managed Recording) was first announced by Sonic Solutions at the end of 2005 and was enabled by the DVD CCA in an amendment late in 2007. By using recordable CSS, movies can be burned to DVD in encrypted form just as on regular mass-manufactured DVDs.

With the Qflix system, writing CSS to recordable DVD requires special DVD writers and special-made recordable DVD-R media. The first Qflix drive and special Qflix media became available end of 2008. Prices of drives and media are higher than standard DVD drives and media. Dual-layer Qflix discs (DVD-9s) became available in the second half of 2009.

Recordable CSS DVD media are not writable in standard DVD burners and will not be recognized as blank media. Using Qflix technology with DVD-RW, DVD+R, and DVD+RW is technically possible but has not been pursued by the companies involved. The Qflix media is able to be written with a DXE Protected Disc Recorder (PDR).

It has been proven possible to use standard DVD recordable media to record CSS with more advanced disc writer technology, such as the DXE PDR. This removes the redundant requirement for the use of expensive custom media and all of the related infrastructure and royalty costs.

== Usage ==
Qflix drives, media, or software are available from or used by Allied Vaughn, Amazon CreateSpace, Blockbuster, CMC, CinemaNow, Dell, Pioneer, PLDS, Plextor, Primera, Rimage, Ritek, and Verbatim/MKM.

== Alternatives ==
An alternative including CSS and anti-ripping for recordable DVDs is ProtectBURN Video or SecureBurn from Protect Software. Non-CSS alternatives for recordable DVDs, primarily incorporating anti-ripping, are available from Fortium, Macrovision, Sony, XProtect, and others.

The only true working alternative to the Qflix system that correctly writes the mandated CSS protection as per the DVD-CCA amendment is offered by Australian company DXE Limited. It relies on a special DVD recorder named the PDR (Protected Disc Recorder) that is capable of writing not only CSS content to standard DVD recordable media, but it is also able to perfectly replicate almost all optical disc anti-piracy protection systems. As it doesn't require any kind of special media, there are no additional costs or requirements for new media types. Furthermore, the higher burning speed and reliability (including playback compatibility) of the discs produced by the DXE system have been proven to be superior of that as provided by the Qflix system.

== See also ==
- DVD Copy Control Association
- Content Scramble System

== Notes and references ==
- engadget
- paidContent.org
- Reuters
- CrunchGear
- VideoBusiness
- DXE Limited : Protected Disc Recorder
