= RealNetworks, Inc. v. DVD Copy Control Ass'n =

2009 court case

- Court: United States District Court for the Northern District of California
- Decided: August 11, 2009
- Docket nos.: 3:08-cv-04548
- Citation: 641 F. Supp. 2d 913

Case history
- Subsequent actions: No. 3:08-cv-04548, 2010 U.S. Dist. LEXIS 1433 (N.D. Cal. January 8, 2010) (Antitrust claims dismissed)

Holding
- RealNetworks violated the anti-trafficking provisions of the Digital Millennium Copyright Act (DMCA) by allowing users of RealDVD software product to make permanent backup copies of copyrighted DVDs. A preliminary injunction was granted to forbid RealNetworks from manufacturing and distributing RealDVD, or any other similar software product.

Court membership
- Judge sitting: Marilyn Hall Patel

Keywords
- Digital Millennium Copyright Act, Anti-circumvention, Copyright

RealNetworks, Inc. v. DVD Copy Control Association, Inc., 641 F. Supp. 2d 913 (2009), is a United States District Court case involving RealNetworks, the movie studios, and DVD Copy Control Association regarding the Digital Millennium Copyright Act (DMCA) claims on the manufacturing and distribution of RealDVD, and a breach of license agreement. The district court concluded that RealNetworks violated the anti-circumvention and anti-trafficking provisions of the DMCA when the DVD copying software RealDVD bypasses the copy protection technologies of DVD.

This lawsuit is one of the many legal actions taken by the movie studios in an attempt to restrict the copying of DVDs.

== Background ==
This case involves the digital media company RealNetworks, DVD Copy Control Association (DVD CCA) and the major motion picture studios. RealNetworks licensed the Content Scramble System (CSS), a technology commonly used on copyrighted DVDs to prevent unauthorized copying, from DVD CCA and released the product RealDVD that allows users to make hard drive copies of copyrighted DVDs. However, some major movie studios feel that RealDVD can threaten the emerging market in digital downloads and encourage people to make copies of rental DVDs instead of purchasing. RealNetworks, on the other hand, believes that copying of DVD is now legal after the favorable ruling of a 2007 California Superior Court case against Kaleidescape, a manufacturer of high-end media servers capable of copying copyrighted DVD content to the servers. Therefore, RealNetworks sued the DVD CCA and several major movie studios on September 30, 2008 seeking for a declaratory judgment that RealDVD neither violated the Digital Millennium Copyright Act (DMCA) 17 U.S.C. § 1201 nor breached the licensing contract with DVD CCA. On the same day, the studios sued RealNetworks by alleging that RealNetworks violated the DMCA and breached the contract.

== District court ruling ==
The district court issued a temporary restraining order on October 3, 2008 after the initial hearing of the case to prevent the sale and distribution of RealDVD. The temporary restraining order was turned into a preliminary injunction against RealNetworks on August 11, 2009 by Judge Marilyn Hall Patel, barring the manufacturing and distribution of RealDVD or any other similar software product after the court found that RealNetworks violated the DMCA and breached the CSS licensing agreement with DVD CCA.

=== DMCA claims on Content Scramble System ===
The DMCA prohibits circumvention of "effective" access control of copyrighted works and the trafficking of tools that are designed primarily to circumvent "effective" access control or copy control of copyrighted works. RealNetworks alleged that that CSS is not effective anymore because it has been cracked or hacked. However, the court ruled that the DMCA statute does not require the access control or copy control technology to be strong as long as it prevents unauthorized access and/or copying under ordinary course of operation and with the authority of the copyright owner. Since the court concluded that CSS is still effective for ordinary uses, the DMCA claim against RealNetworks is valid.

The court decided that RealDVD is primarily designed or produced to circumvent CSS technology. In particular, the court found that the removal of crucial CSS technology in DVD drive-locking, secure storage of content keys on DVD, CSS authentication and CSS bus encryption during the playback of copied DVD content from the hard drive is a circumvention of CSS, even though they are not needed when playback from the hard drive. The court further explained that even though RealNetworks is a licensee of CSS technology, it does not shield RealNetworks from DMCA claim because the removal of CSS technology is a violation of DMCA.

=== DMCA claims on Sony ARccOS and Macrovision RipGuard ===
RealDVD also circumvented copy control measure in Sony ARccOS Protection and Macrovision RipGuard, which are designed not to impair normal playback but to prevent copying by inserting intentional bad sectors and fake menu structures to the DVDs, by mimicking the way human watches a DVD or by skipping the unreadable data. RealNetworks contended that Sony ARccOS and Macrovision RipGuard are not effective copy control measure because they only prolong the copying process. The district court rejected this argument because ARccOS and RipGuard may make copying take so long that copying is essentially not viable. RealNetworks then argued that ARccOS and RipGuard are never encountered during normal playback, leaving a back door to copying wide open, thus, they are not effective copy control measures. But the court disagreed with this argument because if this is the law, then "effective" copy protection measure will have to prevent against every possible current and future means of copying. Finally, RealNetworks asserted that regular DVD players can make temporary copies as cache, so ARccOS and RipGuard do not prevent copying. However, the court deemed this argument flawed by distinguishing that cache copies are byproduct of playback, but copies made by RealDVD are permanent.

=== RealNetworks accused of evidence destruction ===
Before the March 16, 2009 hearing the DVD Copy Control Association, Inc. wrote to U.S. District Judge Marilyn Hall Patel that RealNetworks had destroyed critical pieces of evidence and that this had irrevocably damaged the integrity of the judicial process. The claim was that RealNetworks knew from the start that what they were producing had a high likelihood of resulting in legal action so the company took measures to cover its tracks along the way. The documentation of this released to the public was heavily redacted, however it indicated that RealNetworks intentionally eliminated engineering notebooks, code files, and documents that pointed to the fact that the RealDVD software was mainly produced by hackers.

=== Breach of license agreement ===
RealNetworks argued that it fully complied with the CSS license agreement not only by preserving all of the associated protection but also by adding Advanced Encryption System (AES) encryption to the copied content so that only the person who made the copy can play back the copied content with RealNetworks' player. However, the court decided that preserving the CSS protection only once during the initial playback of the DVD is not enough and any subsequent absence of CSS technology during the playback of copied DVD content from the hard drive is a contract violation.

=== Antitrust claims ===
On May 14, 2009, RealNetworks amended the lawsuit to include antitrust claims against DVD CCA and the major studios, alleging that the delayed product launch of RealDVD, temporary restraining order and preliminary injunction are the results of DVD CCA and the movie studios conspiring to deny the licensing of CSS to make hard drive copies of DVD content. However, the court dismissed the claim because consumer can get the same hard drive copies through digital downloads, and some DVDs even come with an additional, non-CSS encrypted DVD that allows the users to copy the content onto the hard drive. Also, even if RealNetworks is able to obtain a license to circumvent CSS, RealNetworks still violated the DMCA for circumventing ARccOS and RipGuard.

== Subsequent development ==
In November 2009, RealNetworks filed an appeal to the United States Court of Appeals for the Ninth Circuit, asking to remove the injunction on the sales of RealDVD. RealNetworks claimed that the district court applied an incorrect legal standard in granting a request by the major studios to halt sales of the software and was wrong to presume RealDVD would cause the film industry irreparable harm. In March 2010, RealNetworks and DVD CCA reached a settlement in which RealNetworks agreed to the injunction against selling the RealDVD software and a payment of $4.5 million in legal cost to the studios. It would also refund the payments from the approximately 2,700 current users of RealDVD.

Despite the defeat of DVD-copying tools in this and other court cases, many similar software, such as HandBrake which by itself only works with unprotected digital media, continue to be free and widespread on the internet. Some believe that this indicates the ineffectiveness of the major studios' effort to restrict the copying of DVDs through legal rulings.

== Related cases ==
- Universal City Studios, Inc. v. Reimerdes is one of the first cases that tested the DMCA in dealing with the legality of unlicensed CSS decryption software. In this case, the movie studios sought for an injunction against the distribution of DeCSS, a program made to allow the copying of DVD content onto the hard drive.
- 321 Studios v. Metro Goldwyn Mayer Studios, Inc. is another early DMCA case trying to determine the legitimacy of software that allows the users to make copies of DVDs. In this case, 321 Studios stressed that such a software is legal because it allows users to make fair use copies of DVD content.
- DVD Copy Control Association, Inc. v. Kaleidescape, Inc. is a closely related case in the sense that both Kaleidescape's and RealNetworks' systems are meant to allow the users to better organize their media content through DVD copies on the hard drive. But unlike the RealNetworks case, the Kaleidescape case addresses only the breach of CSS license agreement.

== See also ==
- Digital Millennium Copyright Act
- Anti-circumvention
