= DVD Copy Control Ass'n, Inc. v. Kaleidescape, Inc. =

DVD Copy Control Association, Inc. v. Kaleidescape, Inc.
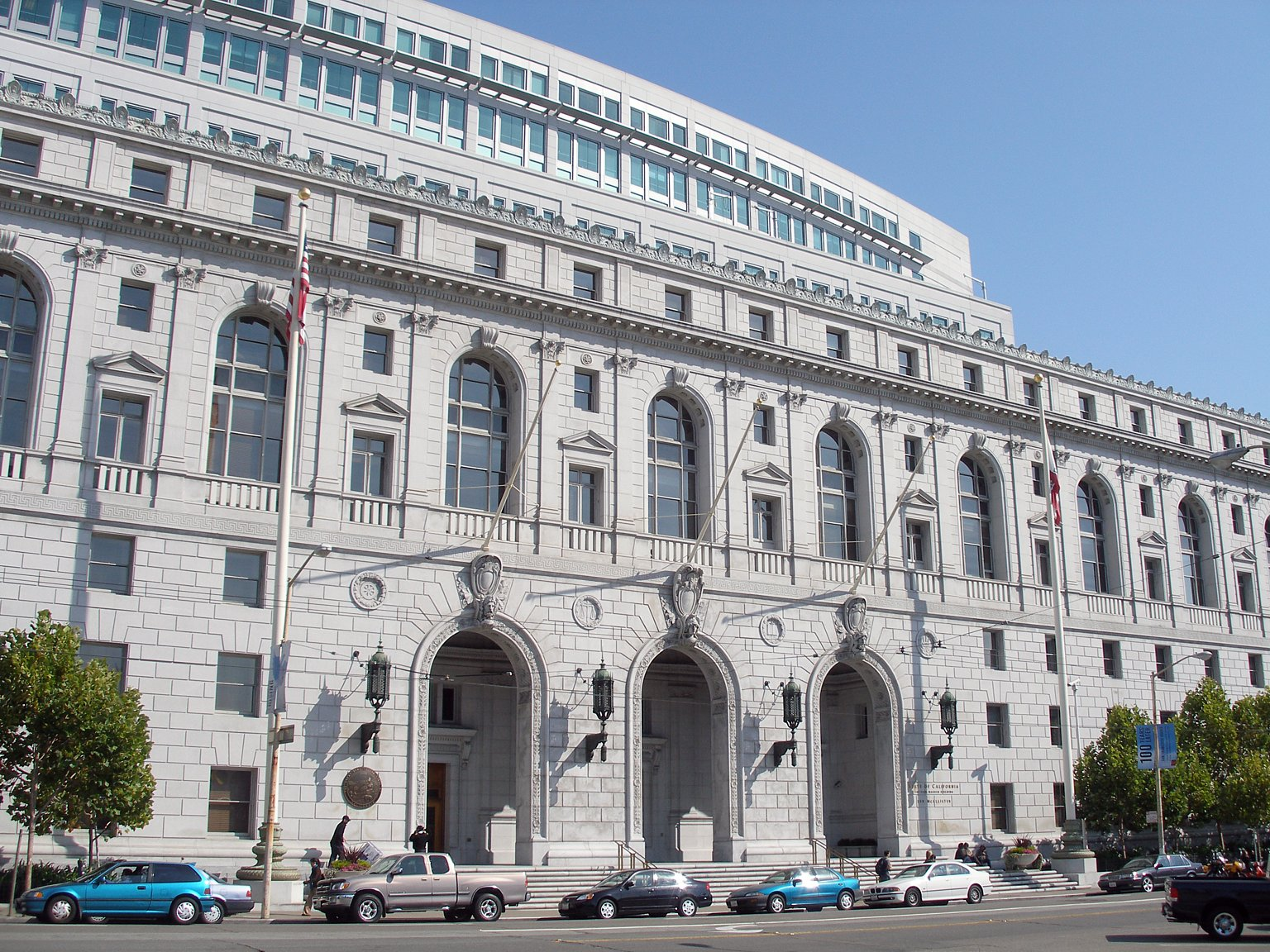
- Court: California Courts of Appeal
- Decided: Aug. 12, 2009
- Citations: 176 Cal. App. 4th 697, 97 Cal. Rptr. 3d 856

Court membership
- Judges sitting: Conrad L. Rushing, Eugene M. Premo, Franklin D. Elia

Keywords
- Digital rights management, DMCA

DVD Copy Control Association, Inc. v. Kaleidescape, Inc., 176 Cal. App. 4th 697 is a legal case heard by the California Court of Appeal concerning breach of contract and breach of the implied covenant of good faith and fair dealing. It discusses incorporation by reference regarding a supplemental document that was not part of the written license agreement between the parties. The Court of Appeal reversed the trial court's judgment and ruled in favor of the plaintiff (DVD Copy Control Association), finding that defendant was bound to the entire contract, including the supplemental document.

This case is also of interest in the realm of copyright law due to its tangential relationship to the issues of fair use and the Digital Millennium Copyright Act.

== Background ==
Kaleidescape, Inc., licensed the motion picture industry-supported digital rights management system, Content Scramble System (CSS), from the DVD Copy Control Association (DVD CCA) in order to provide a home entertainment server system that would allow a user to copy physical DVDs to a single persistent storage device. Once in the Kaleidescape system, the DVD content could be stored, organized, and played back at any time, without requiring access to the original DVDs. It would also allow users to make permanent copies of borrowed or rented DVDs.

In particular, the Kaleidescape system would copy the CSS-encrypted files in their entirety from the DVDs using a "reader", which would then save the encrypted files to the "server". Playback would only be allowed via a licensed Kaleidescape "player".

== Trial Court Proceedings ==
In 2004, DVD CCA sued Kaleidescape for breach of contract and breach of the implied covenant of good faith and fair dealing. DVD CCA alleged that because the Kaleidescape system allowed its users to play previously copied content without requiring the DVD to be in the machine at the time of playback, Kaleidescape violated the "CSS General Specifications" section of the license agreement.

Under this particular licensing scheme, the licensee must sign a standard agreement to maintain confidentiality of the CSS technology. At the time of signing, the licensee is not aware of the particular specifications to which the licensee must comply (such as the specification that the original DVD must be inserted into the player at the time of playback). It is only after noting the "membership category", executing the agreement, and paying the required fees, will the licensee receive the "CSS General Specifications".

Since it was found that the General Specifications were not clearly mentioned in the license, the trial court found that those terms were not properly incorporated by reference into the agreement. Thus, in the March 29, 2007 ruling for the case DVD Copy Control Association, Inc. v. Kaleidescape, Inc., No. 1-04-CV031829, (Superior Court of California, Santa Clara County), Judge Leslie C. Nichols ruled in favor of Kaleidescape, finding that Kaleidescape was in full compliance with the DVD CCA's CSS licensing scheme. In particular, it was found that the "CSS General Specifications" were not technically included as part of the license agreement.

Although this case only addressed breach of contract and was not a copyright case, it was considered by some to be an important recent test of fair use precedent, since it circles the question of whether a consumer who has legally purchased a DVD can copy or backup that DVD to whatever end the consumer desires.

== Ruling of the Court of Appeal ==
DVD CCA filed its opening brief in December 2007, appealing the lower court decision to the 6th District Court of Appeal. In August 2009, the Court of Appeal reversed the lower court decision, ruling that the "CSS General Specifications" were a part of the contract. The Court of Appeal did not decide whether Kaleidescape complied with them and instead ordered the trial court to determine any breach of contract. In March 2012, the trial court ruled that Kaleidescape had violated the terms of the contract, and an injunction was issued prohibiting them from selling or supporting the products in question.

=== Discussions of Fair Use ===
There were some fair use comments worthy of note in this case. Considered in the case were memos written by Kaleidescape's founders, including the reflection that enabling consumers to make permanent backups of DVDs would become "a value--loss proposition for content owners and rental businesses because there is no repeat business ever if everyone were to own [home video library] product. Rental business will die, and retail business will suffer because borrowing once to have a permanent copy forever seems too good to forego for the average consumer.”

All three judges concurred, with Judge Rushing offering a separate opinion that addressed a bit more in the realm of fair use. Judge Rushing stated, "In my view, its product was clearly not designed or intended to facilitate the theft of intellectual property; nobody buys it for that purpose; and if it has that incidental effect, it is no worse in most respects--and better in others--than an ordinary personal computer with freely available DVD-copying software." He further commented that, "The disk-in-machine clause is at most a contract term. It is not a moral imperative," referencing the concern that such a system would enable a user to build an entire DVD library by merely copying rented or borrowed DVDs.

Judge Rushing also noted that the features provided by the Kaleidescape system has "no more tendency to permit 'casual users' to engage in 'unauthorized copying'" than a (far less expensive) personal computer. Additionally, the Kaleidescape system only makes one copy to be stored within the system, and does not enable further duplications of that copy. He contrasted this with the capabilities of an equivalent system built on a personal computer, remarking that such a capability for collecting copies of DVDs had been around for years prior to the development of the Kaleidescape system.

== Subsequent History ==
A review was denied on October 22, 2009.

== Related Cases ==
- Incorporation by reference: Shaw v. Regents of University of California (1997) 58 Cal.App. 4th 44, 54
- Unlike the Realnetworks, Inc. et al. v. DVD Copy Control Association, Inc. et al. case, which included issues within the Digital Millennium Copyright Act, DVD Copy Control Association, Inc. v. Kaleidescape, Inc. dealt almost exclusively with California contract law. Both cases, ruled within two days of each other, ruled that companies are bound by the entire CSS license.
- DMCA cases Universal v. Reimerdes and MGM v. 321 Studios addressed the legality of software used for decrypting CSS-encrypted DVDs, and which resulted in copies of the DVDs stored as unencrypted media files that required no licensing for later playback. These systems differed from the Kaleidescape system in that the "player" in the Kaleidescape system was a licensed player that played CSS-encrypted media files---No files were stored in an unencrypted state.
