= Frank A. Stevenson =

Norwegian cryptographer (born 1970)

Frank A. Stevenson (born 1970) is a Norwegian software developer, and part-time cryptanalyst. He is primarily known for his exposition of weaknesses in the DVD Forum's Content Scramble System (CSS). Although the cryptoanalysis was done independently, he is known for his relations to DeCSS, and appeared before the courts as a witness in the Jon Johansen court trial. He also gave a deposition for the DVD CCA v. McLaughlin, Bunner, et al. case.

Stevenson worked for Funcom as a game developer for many years, after which he moved to Kvaleberg to work on mobile phone software. In July 2010, Stevenson published information about vulnerabilities in the A5/1 encryption algorithm used by most 2G GSM networks, and also showed the Kraken software, that demonstrates that the crypto indeed can be broken with modest hardware.

== Games credited ==
Stevenson has been credited with the following video games:

- Anarchy Online: Alien Invasion (2004), Funcom Oslo A/S
- Anarchy Online (2001), Funcom Oslo A/S
- Anarchy Online: The Notum Wars (2001), KOCH Media Deutschland GmbH
- The Longest Journey (1999), IQ Media Nordic
- Dragonheart: Fire & Steel (1996), Acclaim Entertainment, Inc.
- Winter Gold (1996), Nintendo Co., Ltd.

== See also ==
- Cryptography
- Cryptology
- DeCSS
