= Kaleidescape =

High-fidelity movie content source for home cinema

Kaleidescape, Inc.
- Type: Private
- Founded: Mountain View, California, US (February, 2001)
- Headquarters: Mountain View, California, US and Waterloo, Ontario, Canada
- Key people: Tayloe Stansbury, CEO
- Website: www.kaleidescape.com

Kaleidescape, Inc. is an American multimedia company based in Mountain View, California. Founded in 2001, it designs multi-room home entertainment server systems that store and play back video and audio content (such as movies, television shows, and music) to movie players that can be connected to televisions or projectors.

== History ==
=== 2001-2014; Founding and early history ===
Kaleidescape was founded in 2001 by Michael Malcolm, Dan Collens, and Cheena Srinivasan. Malcolm had previously founded Network Appliance and CacheFlow. Malcolm self-funded the startup and the company spent over two years developing its technology in "stealth mode".

Kaleidescape originally focused on building home theater movie servers that could store digital copies of customers’ DVD and Blu-ray collections. Its first movie server was introduced in 2003; the server allowed customers to import DVD content onto a series of hard drives, utilize the company's movie guide database to identify and sort films, and then present the customer's movie collection in an onscreen user interface.

In 2004, the DVD Copy Control Association, the licensor of Content Scramble System (CSS), the technology for the copy control of DVDs, sued Kaleidescape for breach of contract. The DVD CCA alleged that its CSS License did not permit Kaleidescape's movie servers to serve DVDs from copies on hard disk. In June 2014, Kaleidescape and DVD CCA reached a settlement agreement and as of 2019, the company had license agreements with 29 studios to allow the purchase and download of content from its movie store. The case, although only for breach of contract and not a copyright case, was considered by some to be an important recent test of fair use precedent, given advancements in technology and the digital media rights field.

=== 2010-2014; Addition of Blu-ray ===
In 2010, Kaleidescape released its M300 and M500 Blu-ray players as part of its Premiere line for home cinemas. The M500 had Blu-ray copying abilities to allow customers to import Blu-rays, DVDs, and CDs onto home servers. To address the copyright concerns of movie studios, Kaleidescape required the Blu-ray disc to be present when the content was played from the server. Later that year, Kaleidescape launched the industry's first Blu-ray server with its release of its new 100-disc Blu-ray vault. The vault, when paired with the M300 or M500 players, could rip, store, and stream copies of Blu-ray movies throughout a home.

Through Kaleidescape's online movie store, which launched in beta in 2012 and officially opened in May 2013, users are able to add high-definition and standard definition movies to their collections instantly. Cinema One allows the storage and playback of up to 100 Blu-ray quality, 600 DVD quality or 6,000 CD quality titles.

=== 2015-present ===
In 2015, Kaleidescape released the Strato movie player and the Terra movie server. The Strato is a movie-playback device which holds Ultra HD HDR movies as well as DVD quality movies depending on the model. The Terra provides computing and caching services to enhance the performance of the Strato, and provides extra storage space for movies purchased from the store. Content for the Strato can be added by downloading movies from the Kaleidescape movie store.

In November 2020, Tayloe Stansbury was appointed Kaleidescape's new CEO. Norma Garcia-Muro also joined the company as vice president of marketing.

Kaleidescape expanded into theaters in 2024 by selling.its hardware to cinema owners. Cinemas use the technology to access older movie titles, with payments for viewing the titles being paid directly to the studios by the theater.

== Products ==
=== Strato movie player ===
Kaleidescape released the Strato movie player in 2015. In 2017, it released the Strato C, a disc-less movie player with no internal storage. It supports 4K at 60 frames per second as well as surround formats including lossless DTS:X and Dolby Atmos.

=== Terra ===
Terra movie servers are used for additional storage space and faster download speeds than Strato. It can supply content to multiple Strato players, allowing those players to access their own library or that of the Terra.

The Terra also provides computing and caching services to enhance the performance of the Strato players.

== Kaleidescape movie store ==
The Kaleidescape movie store launched in May 2013 in the US and June 2013 in the UK, becoming the first online store to allow users to download Blu-ray quality movies via an internet-based delivery platform. The movie store is built to work only with Kaleidescape's playback systems. Purchased and downloaded movies are downloaded completely to the Strato or Terra products, and played back on the Strato.

The movie store's initial title offerings included a multi-year license agreement with Warner Bros. The movie store expanded its availability to Canada in September 2013. In October 2013, Kaleidescape announced a multi-year studio agreement with Lionsgate, resulting in the addition of approximately 2,000 titles to the store. As of 2021, the company had license agreements with a number of studios, including all the major movie studios, and had licensed over 12,000 DVD, UHD, and Blu-ray-quality movies, and over 2,000 TV seasons.
