= Libdvdcss =

Software library for decrypting DVD movies

libdvdcss
- Developer: VideoLAN
- Stable release: 1.6.0 / July 29, 2026; 2 months ago
- Written in: C
- Operating system: Linux, BSD, BeOS; Windows 95 and later Mac OS X, Solaris, HP-UX
- Platform: Portable
- Type: Library
- License: GNU GPL v2
- Website: www.videolan.org/developers/libdvdcss.html
- Repository: code.videolan.org/videolan/libdvdcss

libdvdcss (or libdvdcss2 in some repositories) is a free and open-source software library for accessing DVDs encrypted with Content Scramble System (CSS). libdvdcss is part of the VideoLAN project and is used by VLC media player and other media player software, such as Ogle, xine-based players, and MPlayer.

== Usage ==
Libdvdcss alone is only a library and cannot play DVDs. DVD player applications, such as VLC media player, use this library to decrypt DVDs. Libdvdcss is optional in many open-source DVD players, but without it, only non-encrypted discs will play.

Using HandBrake or VidCoder for DVD ripping requires that one install libdvdcss (with compilation or Homebrew on macOS).

== Comparison with DeCSS ==
libdvdcss is not to be confused with DeCSS, one of the first free computer programs capable of decrypting CSS. DeCSS uses a cracked DVD player key to perform authentication, whereas libdvdcss uses a generated list of possible player keys. If none of the keys work (for instance, when the DVD drive enforces DVD region codes), libdvdcss brute-forces the key, ignoring the DVD's region code (if any).

== Distribution ==
The legal status of libdvdcss is controversial but there has been—unlike DeCSS—no known legal challenge to it as of June 2022.

Many Linux distributions do not contain libdvdcss (for example, Debian, Ubuntu, Fedora and openSUSE) due to fears of running afoul of copyright laws, but they often provide the tools to let the user install it themselves. For example, it used to be available in Ubuntu through Medibuntu, which is no longer available.

Distributions which come pre-installed with libdvdcss include BackTrack, CrunchBang Linux, LinuxMCE, Linux Mint, PCLinuxOS, Puppy Linux 4.2.1, Slax, Super OS, Pardus, and XBMC Live. It is also in Arch Linux, NixOS and Void Linux's official package repositories.

== See also ==
- Compact Disc and DVD copy protection
