= Arccos =

Arccos, or variants, may refer to:

- arccos(x), one of the inverse trigonometric functions
- ARccOS protection (Advanced Regional Copy Control Operating Solution), a copy-protection system by Sony
