= DoubleTwist =

United States digital media company

doubleTwist Corporation
- Type: Private
- Industry: Digital Media
- Founded: March 2007; 19 years ago San Francisco, California, U.S.
- Founder: Monique Farantzos; (President & Chairman); Jon Lech Johansen; (CEO)
- Headquarters: San Francisco, California
- Website: www.doubletwist.com

doubleTwist Corporation is a digital media company founded by Monique Farantzos and Jon Lech Johansen. It is backed by Index Ventures (Skype, Last.FM) and Northzone Ventures.

The doubleTwist application enables users to send photos and videos to their friends and sync their media library to a wide variety of portable devices.

== Software ==
doubleTwist Music Player is an application available for Android devices. It is compatible with iTunes and Windows Media Player, allowing users to sync movies, pictures, music, and playlists to their mobile device through USB. The software is available free of charge in the Google Play app store. An in-app purchase enables "pro" features including "AirSync" which allows sync over WiFi, AirPlay, UPnP/DLNA support, equalizer, album art search, and removal of podcast ads. Some individual "pro" features are available for purchase either in-app or as separate apps. As of 5 June 2017, doubleTwist Media Player is in version 2.8.1 and has between 10,000,000 and 50,000,000 downloads.

doubleTwist Sync is the companion application for Windows, required for USB sync. A free download is available on the company's homepage. It looks similar to Apple's iTunes media player, but with a few differences (such as the location of the album artwork). Under macOS, the Android device must support USB MSC mass storage mode. For devices supporting only MTP, AirSync must be used.

== Controversy ==
On Friday June 5, 2009, "The Cure for iPhone Envy" billboard ad was put up on the BART exit outside the flagship San Francisco Apple Store. DoubleTwist's contract with BART's ad agency specified that the ad would go up on Monday morning, the day of the Apple Worldwide Developers Conference keynote. However, the ad agency put the ad up early, on the Friday before. Shortly after the ad was put up, it was taken down by a BART employee. BART cited several advertising criteria violations as reasons for the ad being removed, including the original being too dark, and the subsequent redesign inappropriately having a white background. With Apple being a multimillion-dollar client of BART, it is widely suggested that Apple pressured BART into removing the ad.

Some versions of DoubleTwist use OpenCandy, which may install adware or potentially unwanted programs unless the user opts out during installation.
