= DVD Copy Control Ass'n v. Bunner =

DVD CCA v. Bunner
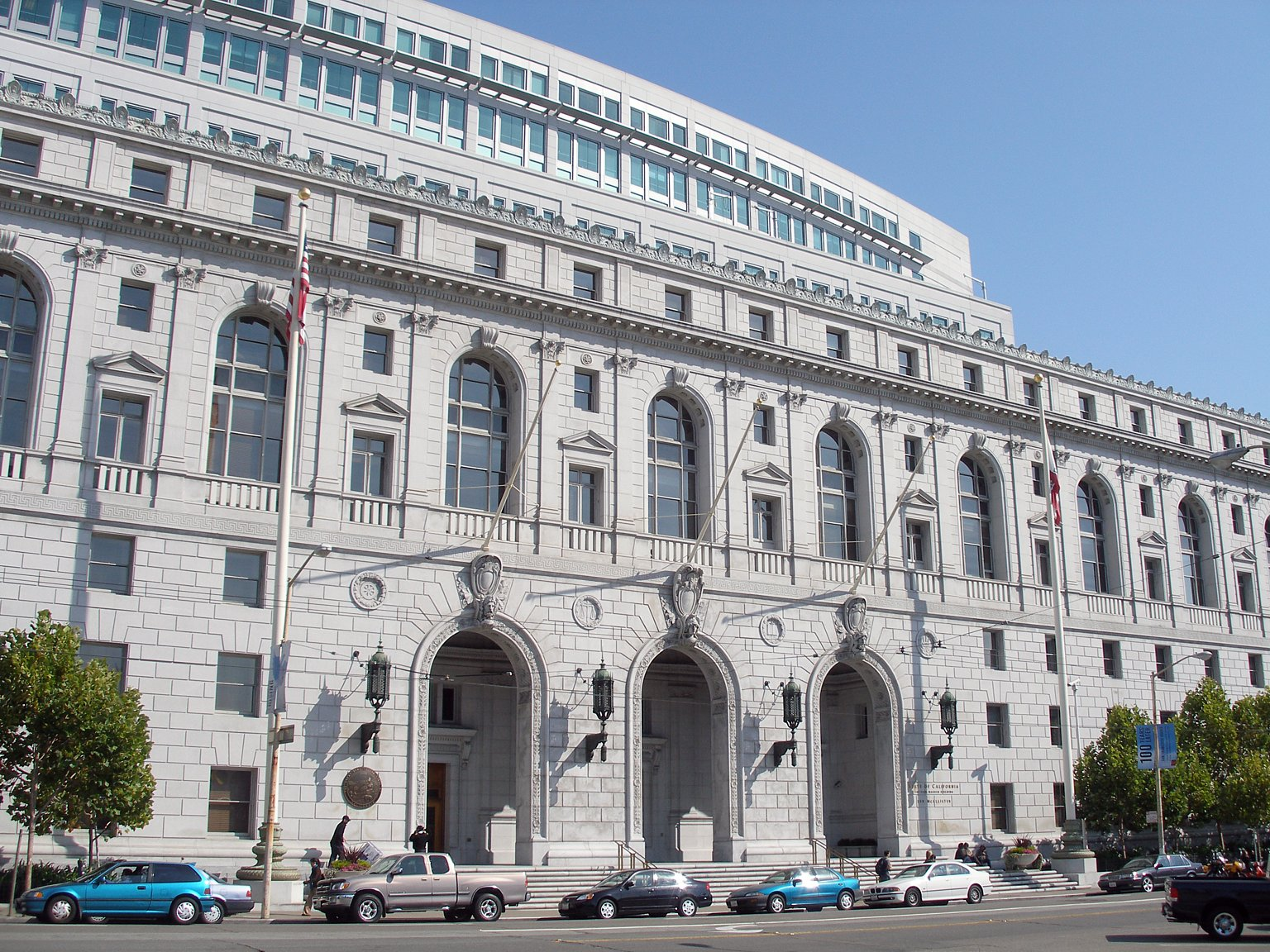
- Court: California Courts of Appeal
- Full case name: DVD Copy Control Association, Inc. v. Andrew Bunner
- Decided: Feb 27, 2004
- Citation: 116 Cal. App. 4th 241

Case history
- Prior actions: Superior Court of California issued an injunction against defendants' distribution of Plaintiff's alleged trade secret in CSS. California Court of Appeal reversed and held that the injunction unduly restrained defendants' First Amendment rights of free speech. The California Supreme Court reversed, finding that the injunction did not necessarily burden free speech, and remanded to the California Court of Appeal to determine the validity of the trade secret misappropriation claim.

Court membership
- Judges sitting: Premo, Elia, Mihara

Case opinions
- On remand, the California Court of Appeal found that there was not enough evidence to support that CCS was still a trade secret at the time of the injunction. Thus the previously granted injunction unnecessarily burdened free speech and was reversed.

Keywords
- Trade secret

DVD Copy Control Association, Inc. v. Bunner was a lawsuit that was filed by the DVD Copy Control Association ("DVD CCA") in California, accusing Andrew Bunner and several others of misappropriation of trade secrets under California's implementation of the Uniform Trade Secrets Act. The case went through several rounds of appeals and was last heard and decided in February 2004 by the California Court of Appeal for the Sixth District.

DVD CCA's alleged trade secret was its "content scramble system" (CSS). The case was first heard in the Superior Court of California in Santa Clara County. The court initially found CSS to be a reasonably guarded trade secret and that its trade secret status should not be destroyed simply because it was posted on the Internet. The preliminary injunction was granted to the plaintiff on January 20, 2000. The defendants appealed to the California Court of Appeal, claiming that the lower court's decision unnecessarily restrained Bunner's First Amendment free speech rights. The Appellate Court agreed with Bunner, which led to a further appeal by DVD CCA to the Supreme Court of California. The Supreme Court of California held that although dissemination of computer code is protected free speech, the First Amendment does not prohibit courts from enjoining speech to protect a legitimate property right. It found that the preliminary injunction did not violate the free speech clauses and remanded for the Appellate Court to "make an independent examination of the entire record" to determine whether there was misappropriation of trade secret.

Finally, on February 27, 2004, the California Court of Appeal for the Sixth District concluded that the CSS technology had lost its trade secret status. Therefore, the preliminary injunction burdened more speech than necessary. The granting of the preliminary injunction was therefore reversed.

== Background ==
DeCSS is a computer program capable of decrypting content on a DVD video disc, essentially circumventing CSS. It was originally written to enable Linux systems to play DVDs, and it uses encryption keys that were obtained by reverse engineering existing DVD players. It was posted on a website by Jon Johansen, one of the original authors, and both the source code and the binary image of the program spread quickly, in part due to an article by Slashdot. Andrew Bunner and many others became aware of this program and reposted copies of DeCSS on the Internet.

After discovering these posts, DVD CCA sent notices to these websites and their service providers demanding the removal of the DeCSS program. The website owners and their service providers did not comply. DVD CCA filed suit against Bunner and others collectively, accusing them of misappropriation of trade secrets and seeking an injunction to prevent them from using or distributing DeCSS or from linking to other websites that disclosed DeCSS.

== Trial court decision ==
The Santa Clara Superior Court granted the preliminary injunction to stop distribution of the DeCSS program and the keys or algorithms of CSS, but did not prohibit the defendants from linking to other websites containing relevant information or using DeCSS explicitly. The court found that CSS was a trade secret that has been well guarded for three years prior to the disclosure of DeCSS, and it was obtained through reverse engineering which was expressly disallowed by the licensing terms of the CSS. In addition, the Court held that further dissemination of the CSS keys and the DeCSS software would lead to irreparable injury to the plaintiff, whereas the impact to remove the software posed minimal impact to the defendants.

== Free speech ==
Both the California Court of Appeal and the Supreme Court of California reviewed this case on the First Amendment grounds. The central issue was whether the injunction violated Bunner's right to free speech assuming DVD CCA likely had a valid trade secret claim. The two courts expressed different opinions. The Court of Appeal held that the injunction violated Bunner's free speech rights under the First Amendment and reversed the Superior Court's injunction. According to the Court of Appeal, DeCSS was "pure speech", and the injunction was an invalid prior restraint on pure speech.

The Supreme Court of California overturned that decision. It recognized that computer programs are subject to Free Speech protection. However, in this case, the restrictions placed by the injunction were content neutral, and were necessary to serve a "significant government interest" (protecting a trade secret). Additionally, CSS was not a subject of public concern and therefore are not subjected to stricter scrutiny. Based on all these findings, the Supreme Court of California remanded for the Court of Appeal to reevaluate the validity of the trade secret claims to decide whether the injunction should be granted or not. Thus, the narrow question before the Supreme Court of California was whether the preliminary injunction violated Bunner's right to free speech under the United States and California Constitutions even though DVD CCA was presumed likely to prevail on its trade secret claim against Bunner.

== Validity of the alleged trade secret ==
Under California’s version of the UTSA, a trade secret consists of "information, including a formula, pattern, compilation, program, device, method, technique, or process, that: (1) Derives independent economic value, actual or potential, from not being generally known to the public or to other persons who can obtain economic value from its disclosure or use; and (2) Is the subject of efforts that are reasonable under the circumstances to maintain its secrecy".

Trade secret misappropriation occurs when somebody does one of the following:

- Acquires another's trade secret with knowledge or reason to know "that the trade secret was acquired by improper means"
- Discloses or uses, without consent, another's trade secret that the person "used improper means to acquire knowledge of"
- Discloses or uses, without consent, another's trade secret that the person, "at the time of disclosure or use, knew or had reason to know, that his or her knowledge of the trade secret" satisfied any of the following conditions:
  - Derived from or through a person who had utilized improper means to acquire it
  - Acquired under circumstances giving rise to a duty to maintain its secrecy or limit its use
  - Derived from or through a person who owed a duty to the person seeking relief to maintain its secrecy or limit its use
- Discloses or uses, without consent, another's trade secret that the person, "before a material change of his or her position, knew or had reason to know that it was a trade secret and that knowledge of it had been acquired by accident or mistake".

The Court of Appeal reevaluated the case solely based on trade secret claims, and ruled for Bunner again. It decided that by the time the case was filed, CSS has lost its trade secret status, because it was widely circulated on the Internet.

In sum, the DVD CCA had failed to establish that the information Bunner republished was still secret at the time he republished it on his website. The trial court's view of this case was colored by the content of the information that DeCSS is designed to circumvent the encryption of DVDs. But the fact that the information at issue was being used for decrypting purposes was not significant from the standpoint of trade secret law.

== Reactions ==
The Electronic Frontier Foundation, which was "thrilled" by the Court of Appeal's final decision, praised it as a vindication of "what we have long said"—the fact that DeCSS "has been available on thousands of websites around the world for many years".

Prior to the California Supreme Court's ruling, attorneys for the DVD CCA felt that the issues at stake in their appeal had broader implications for protection of intellectual property: "This has nothing to do with DVDs, or this particular technology, or with how technology is distributed. [Bunner's attorneys] are arguing that you can't issue injunctions under First Amendment, and we think that is contrary to the way laws have been interpreted for the past 200 years", said Jeffrey Kessler, a partner at Weil, Gotshal & Manges. He stated that First Amendment protections needed to be balanced against the theft and distribution of intellectual property, as well as the DVD CCA's optimism regarding a ruling in their favor, and that the organization would appeal to the U.S. Supreme Court should the decision go the other way.
