= Optical storage media writing and reading speed =

Optical Storage Speeds

In the history of optical storage media there have been and there are different optical disc formats with different data writing/reading speeds.

Original CD-ROM drives could read data at about 150 kB/s, 1× constant angular velocity (CAV), the same speed of compact disc players without buffering. As faster drives were released, the write speeds and read speeds for optical discs were multiplied by manufacturers, far exceeding the drive speeds originally released onto the market. In order to market increasing drive speeds, manufacturers used the symbol n×, whereby n is the multiple of the original speed. For example, writing to a CD at 8× will be twice as fast as writing onto a disc at 4×.

There are two main types of disc speed, which are the angular and linear velocities. If the disc spins at a constant angular velocity, the linear velocity is 2.4 times higher at the outer edge.

== Various optical disc formats writing/reading speeds ==
Comparison of various optical storage media. Parameters: track pitch (p), pit width (w) and minimum length (l), and laser spot size (⌀) and wavelength (λ).

Media	1× sequential speed			Capacity of a single layer (decimal)	Capacity of a single layer (binary)	Full read time (min)
Media	Mbit/s	kB/s	MB/s	Capacity of a single layer (decimal)	Capacity of a single layer (binary)	Full read time (min)
CD	1.229	153.6	0.15	734 MB	700 MiB	80
DVD	11.080	1385.0	1.38	4.7 GB	4.38 GiB	57
HD DVD	36.000	4500.0	4.5	15.0 GB	13.96 GiB	56
Blu-ray	36.000	4500.0	4.5	25.0 GB	23.28 GiB	90

Modern compact discs support a writing speed of 52× and higher, with some modern DVDs supporting speeds of up to 24×. Writing a DVD at 1× (1385000 bytes per second) is approximately 9 times faster than writing a CD at 1× (153600 bytes per second). However, the actual speeds depend on the type of data being written to the disc.

For Blu-ray discs, 1× speed is defined as 36 megabits per second (Mbit/s), which is equal to 4.5 megabytes per second (MB/s). However, as the minimum required data transfer rate for Blu-ray movie discs is 54 Mbit/s, the minimum speed for a Blu-ray drive intended for commercial movie playback should be 2×. The fastest Blu-ray speed is 16×. For CDs, the 1× writing speed is equivalent to the 1× reading speed, which in turn represents the speed at which a piece of media can be read in its entirety, 74 minutes. Those 74 minutes come from the maximum playtime that the Red Book (audio CD standard) specifies for a digital audio CD (CD-DA); although now, most recordable CDs can hold 80 minutes worth of data. The DVD and Blu-ray discs hold a higher capacity of data, so reading or writing those discs in the same 74-minute time-frame requires a higher data transfer rate. Drive speed can be limited intentionally to reduce noise from the drive or slow down ripping, such as the firmware component Riplock.

=== In video games ===
Since their introduction on various optical storage media from the fifth to the sixth generation (1994–2005), video games typically did not require installation on non-optical storage, as the reading speeds of optical drives were sufficient for direct data access from discs. However, with the advent of seventh generation video games, the increasing size of data and the demand for higher-quality texture mapping highlighted a growing disparity between design and graphics requirements and the technological limitations of optical storage's reading speeds and transfer rates.

PlayStation 3 video games were stored on single-layer 25 GB Blu-ray discs. However, like most early Blu-Ray devices the console's optical drive operated at a speed of 2× (9 MB/s). In contrast, the Xbox 360 utilized standard dual-layer DVDs with a capacity of 8.5 GB, and its optical drive ran at a 12× speed multiplier (16.5 MB/s maximum). This meant that the Xbox 360 could deliver data transfer rates up to approximately 85% faster than the PlayStation 3. The slower transfer rate of the PlayStation 3 often prompted multi-platform developers to require a mandatory installation of a portion of the game’s content onto the console's hard disk drive (HDD) to mitigate issues like longer loading times. The Xbox 360 allowed users to install games completely on the hard drive, which could enhance loading times; however, this feature was not mandatory. Optical discs were still necessary to launch games. During the seventh generation of gaming, it was uncommon for titles to fill the entire 25 GB capacity of a single-layer Blu-ray disc. Likewise, few titles required multiple DVDs on the Xbox 360.

Starting with the eighth generation of video game consoles, the demand for full 1080p high-definition video and higher quality textures necessitated a greater data transfer rate. Contemporary Blu-ray optical drives, which operated at a reading speed of 6× (approximately 27 MB/s) quickly became inadequate for these requirements. As a result, consoles like the PlayStation 4 required video games to be fully installed on the hard drive, enabling a higher data transfer rate. Similar to the Xbox 360, optical discs were still necessary to launch the games.

== Theoretical versus practical writing speed ==
Almost all modern CD/DVD-burning software supports a selection of speeds at which the writable disc can be written. However, the option a user chooses only defines the theoretical maximum of disc burning process. There are other factors that influence the time taken for a disc to be written to:

- Resources available to the program: Reading or writing data on a disc consumes moderate to high level of system resources (including memory and CPU resources), and running other programs at the same time may force the CD/DVD drive to choose a lower speed automatically, to accommodate the available resources.
- Disc quality: optical disc recorders detect the available speed options based on the data which is available on the disc itself. However, some low-quality discs make a high-speed option available to the software, while the burning process can never reach that speed in practice.
- The reading and writing process may not happen at a steady speed. CD drives and many early DVD drives stored data with constant linear velocity, so that the data rate remained the same regardless of the position of the optical head. Modern DVD drives use constant angular velocity to allow transferring data at the highest supported physical rotation speed and/or random access without needing to adjust the physical rotation speed on every jump, and zoned constant linear velocity for writing reliably with different data rates in different zones.

== Optimal writing speed ==
A higher writing speed results in a faster disc burn, but the optical quality may be lower (i.e. the disc is less reflective). If the reflectivity is too low for the disc to be read accurately, some parts may be skipped or it may result in unwanted audio artifacts such as squeaking and clicking sounds. For optimal results, it is suggested that a disc be burnt at its rated speed.

== See also ==
- Data-rate units
- List of optical disc authoring software
- Optical disc drive
- Optical disc authoring
- Reading (computer)
