= Riplock =

Riplock is a firmware component of some computer DVD and Blu-ray drives that enforces a speed ceiling below a drive's physical capabilities (typically 2×) when DVD-Video or BDMV data is being read. CDs are usually not affected, nor are DVDs or Blu-rays not authored as videodiscs. Riplock's stated purpose is to reduce noise during video playback by preventing a drive from spinning up faster than would be necessary to read a standards-compliant disc.

It has been asserted that Riplock is also (or solely) intended to deter video ripping (specifically illicit ripping of copyrighted content, i.e., piracy) by making the process artificially time-consuming. For example, a feature film pressed on a dual-layer Blu-ray (the most common variant for commercial movies) can take up to 90 minutes to rip at 2×, while ripping the same film without Riplock would take half an hour or less even with a power-limited slim drive (and potentially as little as 12 minutes with a modern half-height drive and capable system). This theory is lent credence by the fact that nearly all pre-Riplock drives were already calibrated to not spin faster than necessary during real-time video playback, and modern drives not incorporating Riplock continue to be.

Some Riplock drives can be restored to full functionality by applying a third-party firmware patch or, if Riplock was not part of the drive originally but became added through an update, reverting to an earlier revision of the official firmware. Because optical drive firmware is rarely intended to be modified by end users, this will typically void a drive owner's warranty, especially in the former case.

== See also ==
- Optical storage media writing and reading speed
