= Superdistribution =

Digital product distribution approach

Superdistribution is an approach to distributing digital products such as software, videos, and recorded music by making them publicly available in encrypted form, rather than selling them through retail outlets or online shops. Such products can be passed freely among users on physical media, over the Internet or other networks, or using mobile technologies such as Bluetooth, IrDA or MMS (Multimedia Messaging Service). Over 280 models of telephones support superdistribution based on OMA DRM; companies such as Vodafone and Deutsche Telekom have been exploring it.

Superdistribution allows and indeed encourages digital products to be distributed freely in encrypted form, even as the product's owner retains control over the ability to use and modify the product. Superdistribution is a highly efficient means of distribution because distribution is not impeded by any barriers and anyone can become a distributor. A product made available through superdistribution may be free, in which case the user can use it immediately and without restriction, or restricted by means of digital rights management (DRM). Restricted products generally require a license that the user must purchase either immediately or after a trial period (in the case of so-called demoware).

Superdistribution was invented in 1983 by the Japanese engineer Ryoichi Mori and patented by him in 1990. Mori's prototype, which he called the Software Service System (SSS), took the form of a peer-to-peer-architecture with the following components:

- a cryptographic wrapper for digital products that cannot be removed and remains in place whenever the product is copied.
- a digital rights management system for tracking usage of the product and assuring that any usage of the product or access to its code conforms to the terms set by the product's owner.
- an arrangement for secure payments from the product's users to its owner.

== See also ==
- Friend-to-friend
- shareware
- peer-to-peer
