= Ripping =

Copying digital media to a data storage device

Ripping is the extraction of digital content from a container, such as a CD, onto a new digital form and location. Later, the term was applied to ripping WAV or MP3 files from digital audio CDs, and after that to the extraction of contents from any storage media, including DVD and Blu-ray discs, as well as the extraction of video game sprites.

Ripping is often used to shift formats, and to edit, duplicate or back up media content. A rip is the extracted content, in its destination format, along with accompanying files, such as a cue sheet or log file from the ripping software.

To rip the contents out of a container is different from simply copying the whole container or a file. When creating a copy, nothing looks into the transferred file, nor checks if there is any encryption or not, and a raw copy is also not aware of any file format. One can copy a DVD byte by byte via programs like the Linux dd command onto a hard disk, and play the resulting ISO file just as one would play the original DVD.

To rip contents is also different from grabbing an analog signal and re-encoding it, as it was done with early-day CD-ROM drives not capable of digital audio extraction (DAE). Sometimes even encoding, i.e., digitizing audio and video originally stored on analog formats, such as vinyl records, is incorrectly referred to as ripping.

== Software ==
A CD ripper is a piece of software designed to extract or rip raw digital audio (in a format commonly called CDDA) from a compact disc to a file or other output. Some all-in-one ripping programs can simplify the entire process by ripping and burning the audio to disc in one step, possibly re-encoding the audio on-the-fly in the process.

For example, audio CDs contain 16-bit, 44.1 kHz LPCM-encoded audio samples interleaved with secondary data streams and synchronization and error correction info. The ripping software tells the CD drive's firmware to read this data. The software parses out just the LPCM samples in a process called demuxing. The software then encapsulates them into a WAV or AIFF file, or feeds them to another codec to produce, for example, a FLAC or MP3 file. This process is called muxing. Some software performs the de-muxing and muxing in a single step called remuxing.

Depending on the capabilities of the ripping software, ripping may be done on a track-by-track basis, or all tracks at once, or over a custom range. The ripping software may also have facilities for detecting and correcting errors during or after the rip, as the process is not always reliable, especially when the CD or the drive containing the CD itself is damaged or defective.

There are also DVD rippers which operate in a similar fashion. Unlike audio CDs, DVDs do contain data formatted in files for use in computers. However, commercial DVDs are often encrypted (for example, using Content Scramble System/ARccOS protection), preventing access to the files without using the ripping software's decryption ability, which may not be legal to distribute or use. DVD files are often larger than is convenient to distribute or copy to CD-R or ordinary (not dual-layer) DVD-R, so DVD ripping software usually offers the ability to re-encode the content, with some quality loss, so it fits in smaller files.

== Legality ==
When the material being ripped is not in the public domain, and the person making the rip does not have the copyright owner's permission, then such ripping may be regarded as copyright infringement. However, some countries either explicitly allow it in certain circumstances, or at least do not forbid it. Some countries also have fair use-type laws which allow unauthorized copies to be made under certain conditions.

=== Europe ===
A directive of the European Union allows its member nations to institute in their legal framework a private copy exception to the authors' and editors' rights. If a member State chooses to do so, it must also introduce compensation for the copyright holders. Most European countries, except for Norway, have introduced a private copying levy that compensates the owners directly from the country's budget. In 2009, the sum awarded to them was $55 million. In all but a few of these countries (exceptions include the UK and Malta), the levy is imposed on all machines and blank materials capable of copying copyrighted works.

Under the directive, making copies for other people is forbidden, and if done for profit, can lead to a jail sentence.

==== Netherlands ====
In the Netherlands, citizens are allowed to make copies of their legally bought audio and video. This includes CD, SACD, as well as DVD and Blu-ray. These copies are called "home copies" and may only be used by the ripper. Public distribution of ripped files is not allowed.

==== Spain ====
In Spain, anyone is allowed to make a private copy of copyrighted material for oneself, provided that the copier has accessed the original material legally.

==== United Kingdom ====
Private copying of copyrighted material is illegal in the United Kingdom. According to a 2009 survey, 59% of British consumers believed ripping a CD to be legal, and 55% admitted to doing it.

In 2010, the UK government sought input on modernizing copyright exceptions for the digital age, and commissioned the Hargreaves Review of Intellectual Property and Growth. The review asserted that a private copying exception was overdue, citing that users were unaware of what was even legally allowed, and that a copyright law where "millions of citizens are in daily breach of copyright, simply for shifting a piece of music or video from one device to another" was not "fit for the digital age". The review recommended, among other things, that the government consider adopting the EU Copyright Directive's recommendation that member states enact an exception for private, noncommercial copying so long as the rights holders receive "fair compensation." Other EU member states chose to implement the exception paired with a tax on music purchases or widely varying levies on copying equipment and blank media. However, the Review reasoned that no such collections are necessary when implementing a copyright exception for format-shifting:

The UK has a thriving market for personal media devices which rely on private copying. We see no economic argument for adding an extra charge to these devices in order to authorise reasonable private acts which are part of the normal use of devices. Indeed, without that copying, normal use of those devices would be largely restricted to playing music or films bought online. We are not aware of strong evidence of harm to rights holders done by this kind of private copying in the normal course of using digital equipment to play works. There is considerable evidence of overall public benefits from consumer use. [...] The Review favours a limited private copying exception which corresponds to what consumers are already doing. As rights holders are well aware of consumers’ behaviour in this respect, our view is that the benefit of being able to do this is already factored into the price that rights holders are charging. A limited private copying exception which corresponds to the expectations of buyers and sellers of copyright content, and is therefore already priced into the purchase, will by definition not entail a loss for right holders.

In August 2011, the government broadly accepted the recommendations of the Hargreaves Review. At the end of 2012, the government published "Modernising Copyright", a document outlining specific changes the government intends to make, including the Hargreaves-recommended exception for private, noncommercial copying.

Following each milestone in the reform process, press reports circulated that ripping non-DRM-protected CDs and DVDs was no longer illegal. However, the actual legislation to implement the changes is not yet in force; the Intellectual Property Office had only begun seeking review of draft legislation in June 2013, and the resulting Statutory Instruments (SIs) were not laid out for Parliamentary approval until March 27, 2014, and were not actually approved until July 14 (Commons) and July 27 (Lords); with an effective date of October 1, 2014. Anticipating approval, the Intellectual Property Office published a guide for consumers to explain the forthcoming changes and to clarify what would remain illegal. The private copying exception may seem to conflict with the existing Copyright Directive prohibition on overriding or removing any DRM or TPM (technical protection measures) that are sometimes used on optical media to protect the content from ripping. However, the "Modernising Copyright" report makes clear that any workarounds to allow access will not involve a relaxation of the prohibition.

On 17 July 2015, the private copying exemption was overturned by the High Court of Justice following a complaint by BASCA, Musicians' Union, and UK Music, making private copying once again illegal. The groups objected to the exclusion of a compensation scheme, presenting evidence contradicting an assertion that an exemption would cause "zero or insignificant harm" to copyright holders and thus did not require compensation.

=== North America ===
==== United States ====
In the U.S., ripping a CD to a file or to another medium for your personal use is generally considered to be legal fair use. Sharing it with anyone else would be an illegal copyright violation. This was decided by the United States Court of Appeals for the Ninth Circuit in the case Recording Industry Ass'n of America v. Diamond Multimedia Systems, Inc., in response to the RIAA's efforts to prevent the sale of the first MP3 players. As a part of the court's ruling in favor of the manufacturer, Justice Blackmun cited Sony Corp. of America v. Universal City Studios, Inc., which established that time shifting was legal, and reasoned that the same principle of fair use also makes place shifting legal.

See the DVD and Blu-ray ripping section for additional considerations when a disc is encrypted.

==== Canada ====
The Copyright Act of Canada generally says that it is legal to make a backup copy of any copyrighted work if the user owns or has a licence to use a copy of the work or subject-matter as long as the user does not circumvent a technological protection measure or give any of the reproductions away. This means that in most cases, ripping DVDs in Canada is most likely illegal.

=== Oceania ===
==== Australia and New Zealand ====
In Australia and New Zealand a copy of any legally purchased music may be made by its owner, as long as it is not distributed to others and its use remains personal. In Australia, this was extended in 2006 to also include photographs and films.

== Opinions of ripping ==
Recording industry representatives have made conflicting statements about ripping.

Executives claimed (in the context of Atlantic v. Howell) that ripping must be regarded as copyright infringement. In oral arguments before the Supreme Court in MGM Studios, Inc. v. Grokster, Ltd., MGM attorney Don Verrilli (later appointed United States Solicitor General by the Obama administration), stated: "The record companies, my clients, have said, for some time now, and it's been on their Website for some time now, that it's perfectly lawful to take a CD that you've purchased, upload it onto your computer, put it onto your iPod. There is a very, very significant lawful commercial use for that device, going forward."

Nevertheless, in lawsuits against individuals accused of copyright infringement for making files available via file-sharing networks, RIAA lawyers and PR officials have characterized CD ripping as "illegal" and "stealing".

When asked directly about the issue, RIAA president Cary Sherman asserted that the lawyers misspoke, and that the RIAA has never said whether it was legal or illegal, emphasizing that the RIAA had not yet taken anyone to court over that issue alone.

=== Fair use ===
Although certain types of infringement scenarios are allowed as fair use and thus are effectively considered non-infringing, "personal use" copying is not explicitly mentioned as a type of fair use, and case law has not yet established otherwise.

=== Personal copying acknowledgments ===
According to Congressional reports, part of the Audio Home Recording Act (AHRA) of 1992 was intended to resolve the debate over home taping. However, 17 USC 1008, the relevant text of the legislation, did not fully indemnify consumers for noncommercial, private copying. Such copying is broadly permitted using analog devices and media, but digital copying is only permitted with certain technology like DAT, MiniDisc, and "audio" CD-R—not with computer hard drives, portable media players, and general-purpose CD-Rs.

The AHRA was partially tested in RIAA v. Diamond Multimedia, Inc., a late-1990s case which broached the subject of a consumer's right to copy and format-shift, but which ultimately only ascertained that one of the first portable MP3 players was not even a "digital recording device" covered by the law, so its maker was not required to pay royalties to the recording industry under other terms of the AHRA.

Statements made by the court in that case, and by both the House and Senate in committee reports about the AHRA, do interpret the legislation as being intended to permit private, noncommercial copying with any digital technology. However, these interpretations may not be binding.

In 2007, the Federal Trade Commission (FTC), a government office that requires businesses to engage in consumer-friendly trade practices, acknowledged that consumers normally expect to be able to rip audio CDs. Specifically, in response to the Sony BMG copy protection rootkit scandal, the FTC declared that the marketing and sale of audio CDs which surreptitiously installed digital rights management (DRM) software constituted deceptive and unfair trade practices, in part because the record company "represented, expressly or by implication, that consumers will be able to use the CDs as they are commonly used on a computer: to listen to, transfer to playback devices, and copy the audio files contained on the CD for personal use."

== DVD and Blu-ray ripping ==
A DVD ripper or Blu-ray ripper is a computer program for copying DVD or Blu-ray discs to disc images. Disc images can then be used to back up or duplicate discs or to convert video to different formats. Some DVD/Blu-ray rippers can also edit or transcode video to different video file formats to reduce file size or for playback on other devices, such as portable media players or mobile phones. Many DVD/Blu-ray rippers can remove or circumvent several types of digital rights management (DRM) and copy protection applied to discs, including Content Scramble System (CSS), Advanced Access Content System (AACS), region codes, Analog Protection System, user operation prohibitions (UOPs), and ARccOS. However, not all software can remove all protections, and some protections may be difficult to circumvent, such as Cinavia.

Common ripping software includes DVD Decrypter, DVD Shrink, and AnyDVD (see Comparison of DVD ripper software). AnyDVD is specialized software that can remove or circumvent many types of protections in the background; this is useful to allow media player software to play protected discs directly (without first copying them to a disc image) as well as to allow other software to access or copy protected discs.

=== Circumvention of DVD copy protection ===
In the case where media contents are protected using some effective copy protection scheme, the Digital Millennium Copyright Act (DMCA) of 1998 makes it illegal to manufacture or distribute circumvention tools and use those tools for infringing purposes. In the 2009 case RealNetworks v. DVD CCA, the final injunction reads, "while it may well be fair use for an individual consumer to store a backup copy of a personally owned DVD on that individual's computer, a federal law has nonetheless made it illegal to manufacture or traffic in a device or tool that permits a consumer to make such copies." This case made clear that manufacturing and distribution of circumvention tools was illegal, but use of those tools for non-infringing purposes, including fair use purposes, was not.

The Library of Congress periodically issues rulings to exempt certain classes of works from the DMCA's prohibition on the circumvention of copy protection for non-infringing purposes. One such ruling in 2010 declared, among other things, that the Content Scramble System (CSS) commonly employed on commercial DVDs could be circumvented to enable non-infringing uses of the DVD's content. The Electronic Frontier Foundation (EFF) hailed the ruling as enabling DVD excerpts to be used for the well-established fair-use activities of criticism and commentary, and for the creation of derivative works by video remix artists. However, the text of the ruling says the exemption can only be exercised by professional educators and their students, not the general public.

=== Anti DVD-ripping efforts ===
All DVD Copy Control Association (DVD CCA)-licensed DVD player/burner manufacturers implement DVD CCA-mandated "robustness" and "compliance" rules on their products in an effort to restrict ripping. Some even go beyond that and implement additional features to restrict ripping, for example:

- RIPLOCK: Some manufacturers put an artificial limit, or lock, on ripping speeds. Some of these drives have alternative 3rd-party firmware that have this removed to enable faster ripping.
- Bitsetting/Booktyping: This is a feature that makes DVD+Rs readable by older DVD players that can play DVD-ROMs only. Some manufacturers disable this feature on their drives. Again, some alternative 3rd-party firmware can enable this so that burned DVDs appear as DVD-ROMs and are playable by older DVD players.
- Regional Playback Control: firmware for DVD drives which enforces DVD region codes

=== Anti Blu-ray ripping efforts ===
In 2014, after legal action against a company producing ripping software, two other companies withdrew from the Blu-ray ripping software market.

== See also ==
- CD ripper
- Blu-ray ripper
- Radio music ripping
- Stream ripping
- Digital video recorder
- Telecine (copying), a copy of a film created with a telecine.
- DVDScr (DVD Screener)
- R5 (bootleg)
- Riplock
- DVD Decrypter
- Comparison of DVD ripper software
- BUP
- IFO file
- DVD authoring
- VOB
- Pirated movie release types
- HandBrake
- List of DVD authoring applications
- DVD-Video
