= DVD Copy Control Association =

The DVD Copy Control Association (DVD CCA) is an organization primarily responsible for the copy protection of DVDs. The Content Scramble System (CSS) was devised for this purpose to make copyright infringement difficult, but also presents obstacles to some legitimate uses of the media. The association is also responsible for the controversial Regional Playback Control (RPC), the region encoding scheme which gives movie studios geographic control over DVD distribution.

As of 2001, members included film distributors such as Metro-Goldwyn-Mayer, Twentieth Century Fox and Warner Bros.

They filed the much publicized case versus Jon Johansen who they alleged wrote DeCSS. The case was dropped in January 2004. CSS decrypting software (such as DVD Decrypter, AnyDVD, and DVD Shrink) allows a region-specific DVD to be copied as an all-region DVD. It also removes Macrovision, CSS, region codes, and user operation prohibitions. They also filed the suit DVD CCA v. Bunner against people who distributed DeCSS, seeking injunctions to stop further distribution based on trade secret claims. The injunction was eventually denied because CSS was no longer a secret by the time litigation occurred.

== Features restricted by manufacturers ==
All DVD CCA-licensed DVD player/burner manufacturers implement DVD CCA-mandated "robustness" and "compliance" rules on their products in an effort to restrict ripping. Some even go beyond that and implement additional features to restrict ripping.

== See also ==
- Blu-ray region code
- Blu-ray, the successor of DVD
- DVD Copy Control Ass'n, Inc. v. Bunner
- Universal City Studios, Inc. v. Reimerdes
- DVD Copy Control Ass'n, Inc. v. Kaleidescape, Inc.
- RealNetworks, Inc. v. DVD Copy Control Ass'n, Inc.
