= Universal City Studios, Inc. v. Corley =

American legal case

- Court: United States Court of Appeals for the Second Circuit
- Full case name: Universal City Studios, Inc., Para-Mount Pictures Corporation, Metro-Goldwyn-Mayer Studios, Inc., Tristar Pictures, Inc., Columbia Pictures Industries, Inc., Time Warner Entertainment Co., L.P., Disney Enterprises, Inc. and Twentieth Century Fox Film Corporation, Plaintiffs, v. Shawn C. Reimerdes, Eric Corley a/k/a "Emmanuel Goldstein," Roman Kazan, and 2600 Enterprises, Inc., Defendants.
- Argued: May 1, 2001
- Decided: November 28, 2001
- Citation: 273 F.3d 429

Holding
- The Digital Millennium Copyright Act prohibits the distribution of software that enables users to circumvent copyright protection mechanisms.

Court membership
- Judges sitting: Jon O. Newman, José A. Cabranes, Alvin W. Thompson

Case opinions
- Majority: Jon O. Newman

Keywords
- Copyright law, anti-circumvention

Universal City Studios, Inc. v. Corley (originally known as Universal City Studios, Inc. v. Reimerdes), 273 F.3d 429 (2nd Cir., 2001), was a court ruling at the United States Court of Appeals for the Second Circuit. This ruling was the first circuit-level test of the anti-circumvention provisions of the Digital Millennium Copyright Act.

== Background ==
Eight plaintiffs – all movie studios – sought an injunction against the distribution of DeCSS, a program capable of decrypting video content that had been encrypted by the Content Scramble System, which was commonly used to protect DVDs from unauthorized copying. DeCSS was developed by Norwegian teenager Jon Johansen and released in October 1999 via LiViD, a mailing list focused on programming tools and software libraries relevant to DVD use on the Linux operating system. DeCSS was distributed by LiViD and other Internet communities without authorization from the DVD Copy Control Association, the trade organization responsible for DVD copy protection.

== District court proceedings ==
In January 2000, the movie studios filed suit under the title Universal City Studios, Inc. v. Reimerdes at the United States District Court for the Southern District of New York. The defendants were Eric Corley (publisher of 2600: The Hacker Quarterly magazine, which copied the DeCSS code for its readers), Shawn Reimerdes (who had posted the code on dvd-copy.com, a personal website), Roman Kazan (who ran an Internet hosting service that provided access to DeCSS), and 2600 Enterprises, Inc. The studios claimed that the defendants, by making DeCSS available, were trafficking in circumvention devices, an illegal act under the Digital Millennium Copyright Act (DMCA). The studios sought an injunction that would prohibit the distribution and use of the DeCSS program, as well as monetary damages.

At the beginning of the proceedings, the district court granted a preliminary injunction barring the defendants from posting the code for DeCSS. The court felt this precaution was necessary given that the movie studios made a reasonable argument that widespread dissemination of DeCSS would cause irreparable harm to their interests. Reimerdes and Kazan then entered into consent decrees with the plaintiffs and were subsequently dropped from the suit. Both were then barred from posting the DeCSS code or providing links to sites where the code could be found.

Corley removed the DeCSS code from 2600.com after the preliminary injunction was issued, but did not reach a settlement of his own with the plaintiffs and remained a defendant in the suit. In what Corley termed an act of "electronic civil disobedience," 2600.com continued to host links to other websites that themselves provided the source code for DeCSS. Corley also moved for the court to overturn the Digital Millennium Copyright Act altogether as a violation of the First Amendment, because it restricted citizens from distributing and discussing programming code, which in turn is an item of expression.

In August 2000, Judge Lewis A. Kaplan ruled in favor of the plaintiffs. Kaplan acknowledged the tension in the Digital Millennium Copyright Act between copyright holders and those who wish to use new technologies, but concluded that the language of the act provided relief for the plaintiffs against unauthorized copying of their copyrighted works. In Kaplan's words, "For now, at least, Congress has resolved this clash in the DMCA and in plaintiffs' favor. Given the peculiar characteristics of computer programs for circumventing encryption and other access control measures, the DMCA as applied to posting and linking here does not contravene the First Amendment."

Judge Kaplan also held that the Corley and 2600.com had violated the DMCA by continuing to post the code that ran afoul of the act's anti-circumvention provisions. Kaplan issued another injunction against Corley, prohibiting him from posting the DeCSS code or providing links to sites where the code could be found.

Corley appealed this ruling to the U.S. Court of Appeals for the Second Circuit.

== Circuit court ruling ==
Corley's appeal at the Second Circuit, now under the name Universal City Studios, Inc. v. Corley because Shawn Reimerdes had been removed as a defendant, received numerous amicus curiae briefs from both the entertainment industry and supporters of Internet innovations.

In November 2001, the Second Circuit upheld Kaplan's ruling at the lower court. However, the circuit court found merit in Corley's view that computer programs are a form of protected speech regardless of whether they are in source code or object code form, which commentators regarded as significant. The circuit court opined that the Digital Millennium Copyright Act could be subjected to intermediate scrutiny as a partial restriction on free speech. Citing the Supreme Court precedent Hill v. Colorado, the circuit court held that some laws can restrict speech for reasons that are "justified without reference to the content" if there are larger public benefits from the speech restrictions. Hence, due to the conflict with the DMCA in the present case, DeCSS was held to be a form of speech but it could be restricted due to its functionality (circumvention that is prohibited per the DMCA) and not its content.

The circuit court also considered Corley's fair use defense, as Corley argued that DeCSS allowed users to watch encrypted DVDs, which prior to that point had been impossible on Linux machines. The circuit court held that the specific facts of the present case were beyond the types of fair use that are permissible under the DMCA. According to the court, "the Appellants do not claim to be making fair use of any copyrighted materials, and nothing in the injunction prohibits them from making such fair use. They are barred from trafficking in a decryption code that enables unauthorized access to copyrighted materials."

== Impact and subsequent developments ==
Both the district and circuit court rulings were controversial, and have been widely criticized by free speech advocates such as the American Civil Liberties Union and the Electronic Frontier Foundation, as well as the American Library Association, the author of The Boondocks, and others, due to upholding legal restrictions on expressive programming code. On the other hand, some media and content-owning organizations, such as the National Football League and Major League Baseball, supported the decisions.

Corley initially planned to appeal the circuit court decision to the Supreme Court, but decided not to after consultation with his lawyers. Despite the courts' rulings, the DeCSS code is still widely available on the Internet and has been used in many subsequent video ripping products.
