= Jon Lech Johansen =

Norwegian programmer (born 1983)

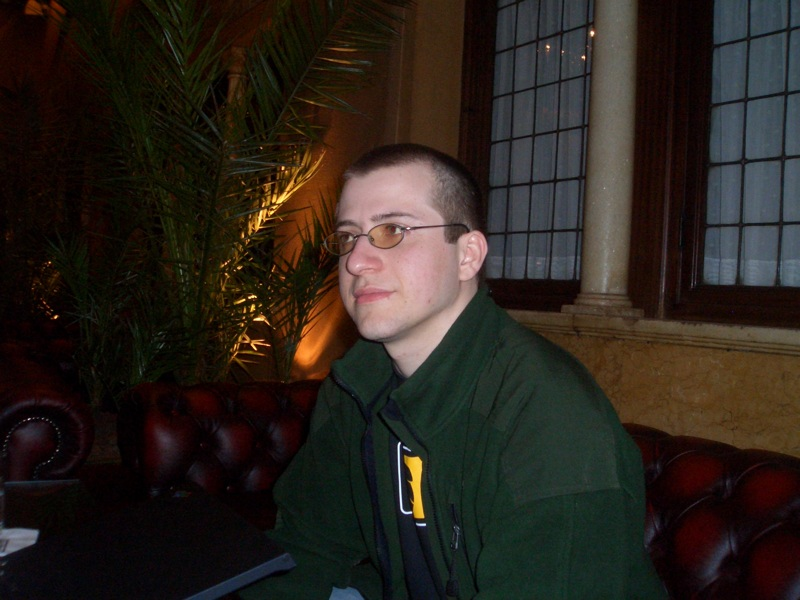
- Jon Lech in 2005
- Born: November 18, 1983 (age 42); Harstad, Troms, Norway
- Known for: DeCSS
- Website: nanocr.eu

Jon Lech Johansen (born November 18, 1983, in Harstad, Norway), also known as DVD Jon, is a Norwegian programmer who has worked on reverse engineering data formats. He wrote the DeCSS software, which decodes the Content Scramble System used for DVD licensing enforcement. Johansen is a self-trained software engineer, who quit high school during his first year to spend more time with the DeCSS case. He moved to the United States and worked as a software engineer for about a year, from October 2005 until November 2006, whereupon he returned to Norway. Johansen moved back to the United States in June, 2007.

== Early life and education ==
Jon Lech Johansen was born in Harstad to a Norwegian father and a Polish mother. The family later moved to Lardal Municipality, where he grew up. At the age of twelve, Johansen began learning programming. He attended Thor Heyerdahl Upper Secondary School in Larvik.

In a post on his blog, he said that in the 1990s he started with a book (Programming the 8086/8088), the web ("Fravia's site was a goldmine") and IRC ("Lurked in a x86 assembly IRC channel and picked up tips from wise wizards").

== DeCSS prosecution ==
After Johansen released DeCSS, he was taken to court in Norway for computer hacking in 2002. The prosecution was conducted by the Norwegian National Authority for the Investigation and Prosecution of Economic and Environmental Crime (Økokrim in Norwegian), after a complaint by the US DVD Copy Control Association (DVD-CCA) and the Motion Picture Association (MPA). Johansen has denied writing the decryption code in DeCSS, saying that this part of the project originated from someone in Germany. He only developed the GUI component of the software. His defense was assisted by the Electronic Frontier Foundation. The trial opened in the Oslo District Court on December 9, 2002, with Johansen pleading not guilty to charges that had a maximum penalty of two years in prison or large fines. The defense argued that no illegal access was obtained to anyone else's information, since Johansen owned the DVDs himself. They also argued that it is legal under Norwegian law to make copies of such data for personal use. The verdict was announced on January 7, 2003, acquitting Johansen of all charges.

Two further levels of appeals were available to the prosecutors, to the appeals court and then to the Supreme Court. Økokrim filed an appeal on January 20, 2003, and it was reported on February 28 that the Borgarting Court of Appeal had agreed to hear the case. Johansen's second DeCSS trial began in Oslo on December 2, 2003, and resulted in an acquittal on December 22, 2003. Økokrim announced on January 5, 2004, that it would not appeal the case to the Supreme Court.

== Other projects ==
In the first decade of the 21st century, Johansen's career has included many other projects.

=== 2001 ===
In 2001, Johansen released OpenJaz, a reverse-engineered set of drivers for Linux, BeOS and Windows 2000 that allow operation of the JazPiper MP3 digital audio player without its proprietary drivers.

=== 2003 ===
In November 2003, Johansen released QTFairUse, an open source program which dumps the raw output of a QuickTime Advanced Audio Coding (AAC) stream to a file, which could bypass the digital rights management (DRM) software used to encrypt content of music from media such as those distributed by the iTunes Music Store, Apple Computer's online music store. Although these resulting raw AAC files were unplayable by most media players at the time of release, they represent the first attempt at circumventing Apple's encryption.

=== 2004 ===
Johansen had by now become a VideoLAN developer, and had reverse engineered FairPlay and written VLC's FairPlay support. It has been available in VideoLAN CVS since January 2004, but the first release to include FairPlay support is VLC 0.7.1 (released March 2, 2004).

=== 2005 ===
On March 18, 2005, Travis Watkins and Cody Brocious, along with Johansen, wrote PyMusique, a Python based program which allows the download of purchased files from the iTunes Music Store without DRM encryption. This was possible because Apple Computer's iTunes software adds the DRM to the music file after the music file is downloaded. On March 22, Apple released a patch for the iTunes Music Store blocking the use of his PyMusique program. The same day, an update to PyMusique was released, circumventing the new patch.

On June 26, 2005, Johansen created a modification of Google's new in-browser video player (which was based on the open source VLC media player) less than 24 hours after its release, to allow the user to play videos that are not hosted on Google's servers.

In late 2005, Håkon Wium Lie, the Norwegian CTO of Opera Software, co-creator of Cascading Style Sheets and long-time supporter of open source, named Johansen a "hero" in a net meeting arranged by one of Norway's biggest newspapers. On September 2, 2005, The Register published news that DVD Jon had defeated encryption in Microsoft's Windows Media Player by reverse engineering a proprietary algorithm that was ostensibly used to protect Windows Media Station NSC files from engineers sniffing for the files' source IP address, port or stream format. Johansen had also made a decoder available.

In September 2005, Johansen announced the release of SharpMusique 1.0, an alternative to the default iTunes program. The program allows Linux and Windows users to buy songs from the iTunes music store without copy protection. In 2005, Johansen worked for MP3tunes in San Diego as a software engineer. His first project was a new digital music product, code-named Oboe.

==== Sony BMG DRM rootkit ====
In November 2005, a Slashdot story claimed that Sony-BMGs Extended Copy Protection (XCP) DRM software includes code and comments (such as "copyright (c) Apple Computer, Inc. All Rights Reserved.") illegally copied from an iTunes DRM circumvention program by Johansen. A popular claim was that, using the criteria that RIAA uses in its copyright lawsuits, Johansen could sue for billions of dollars in damages.

=== 2006 ===
On January 8, 2006, Johansen revealed his intent to defeat the encryption of next-generation DVD encryption, Advanced Access Content System (AACS). On June 7, 2006, he announced that he had moved to San Francisco and was joining DoubleTwist Ventures. In October 2006, Johansen and DoubleTwist Ventures announced they had reverse engineered Apple Computer's DRM for iTunes, called FairPlay. Rather than allow people to strip the DRM, DoubleTwist would license the ability to apply FairPlay to media companies who wanted their music and videos to play on the iPod, without having to sign a distribution contract with Apple.

=== 2007 ===
In July 2007, Johansen managed to allow the iPhone to work as an iPod with WiFi, without AT&T activation.

=== 2008 ===
On February 2, 2008, Johansen launched doubleTwist, which allows customers to route around DRM in music files and convert files between various formats. The software converts digital music of any bitrate encoded with any popular codec into a format that can be played on any device.

=== 2009 ===
In June, he managed to get an advertisement for his application doubleTwist on the wall of the Bay Area Rapid Transit exit outside the San Francisco Apple Store, just days before the 2009 WWDC event. On June 9, it was reported that the advertisement was removed by BART for allegedly "being too dark" and not allowing enough light into the adjoining transit station. The advertisement was later redesigned and redeployed with a transparent background.

== Awards ==
- January 2000 – Karoline Prize
- April 2002 – EFF Pioneer Award
