= Regional Playback Control =

Regional lockout technology for DVDs

RPC-1 and RPC-2 are designations applied to firmware for DVD drives to enforce regional lockout. Older DVD drives use RPC-1 firmware, which allows DVDs from any region to play. Newer drives use RPC-2 firmware, which enforces DVD region coding at the hardware level. See DVD region code § Computer DVD drives for further information.

One reason that that the regional lock is used, is to prevent people from buying a DVD of a film in one country, then taking to it another country where the film may still be in cinemas.

Some RPC-2 drives can be converted to RPC-1 with the same features as before by using alternative firmware on the drive, or on some drives by setting a secret flag in the drive's EEPROM.
