= ARccOS protection =

DVD copy protection system by Sony

ARccOS (Advanced Regional Copy Control Operating Solution) is a copy-protection system made by Sony that is used on some DVDs. Designed as an additional layer to be used in conjunction with Content Scramble System (CSS), the system deliberately creates corrupted sectors on the DVD, which cause copying software to produce errors (see bad sector). The corrupted sectors are in areas of the disc that most DVD players do not access, but most copying software does.

Despite being promoted as "fully compatible with available DVD players and drives," some DVDs with ARccOS cannot be played on some DVD players: Sony DVPCX995, Toshiba SD4700, Harman Kardon DVD101, Microsoft Xbox and others. Sony has announced a future firmware update for their players to fix this incompatibility issue. One revision of the ARccOS scheme used by Sony was incompatible with a higher number of players than average. Sony has offered to replace those discs for owners having problems; the replacement discs will have a newer version of ARccOS coding on them, which Sony claims is more compatible. Some DVD rental companies have warned users that the Sony DVDs in question may not play on their machines. Many DVD rippers have been designed to overcome ARccOS protection; it is also naturally overcome by using ddrescue, a Linux utility designed to copy images with errors.

== See also ==
- Compact Disc and DVD copy protection
