= C&R =

C&R may refer to:

- Constable & Robinson, a UK independent book and ebook publisher
- Curio and Relic, a type of Federal Firearms License
- Cops and Robbers, a chase game
- Lynx C&R reconnaissance vehicle
- Compliance and Robustness, the legal structure or regime underlying a Digital Rights Management (DRM) system
- Communities and Residents, formerly Citizens & Ratepayers, a political group in Auckland, New Zealand
- Catch and release, a practice within recreational fishing intended as a technique of conservation
- Bureau of Construction and Repair, a department of the US Navy
- Cherry and Ritz Cheritz, company who made the otome game Mystic messenger
- C&R Wise AI Limited, an AI company

== See also ==
- CNR (disambiguation)
- Cops and Robbers (disambiguation)
