= Protected Media Path =

Set of technologies

The Protected Media Path is a set of technologies creating a "Protected Environment," first included in Microsoft's Windows Vista operating system, that is used to enforce digital rights management (DRM) protections on content. Its subsets are Protected Video Path (PVP) and Protected User Mode Audio (PUMA). Any application that uses Protected Media Path in Windows uses Media Foundation.

== Overview ==
The protected environment in which DRM content is played contains the media components that play DRM content, so the application only needs to provide remote control (play, rewind, pause, and so on), rather than having to handle unprotected content data. The protected environment also provides all the necessary support for Microsoft-approved (signed) third-party software modules to be added. It provides a "wall" against outside copying, where within the walls, content can be processed without making the content available to unapproved software.

In order to prevent users from copying DRM content, Windows Vista provides process isolation and continually monitors what kernel-mode software is loaded. If an unverified component is detected, then Vista will stop playing DRM content, rather than risk having the content copied. The protected environment is implemented completely in software, so software-based attacks such as patching the Windows kernel are possible.

These restrictions concern the various outputs from the PC. For DRM content, digital outputs such as Digital Visual Interface (DVI) and High Definition Multimedia Interface (HDMI) will have High-bandwidth Digital Content Protection (HDCP) enabled, to prevent someone from recording the digital stream. Even analog TV-style outputs typically require some restrictions, provided by mechanisms such as Macrovision and CGMS-A. These restrictions only apply to DRM-restricted content, such as HD DVD or Blu-ray that are encrypted with AACS, and also apply in Windows XP using supported playback applications. Users' standard unprotected content will not have these restrictions. Some output types such as S/PDIF (Sony/Philips Digital Interchange Format) typically don't have a suitable DRM scheme available, so these need to be turned off reliably if the content so specifies.

In Vista, the control of PC video outputs is provided by PVP-OPM, which is essentially the next generation of Certified Output Protection Protocol (COPP) introduced in Windows XP. However, rather than being a software application programming interface, PVP-OPM operates with the Windows media components in the protected environment.

Additionally, PVP-UAB (Protected Video Path - User-Accessible Bus) is used to encrypt video and audio data as it passes over the PCI-Express bus, to prevent it from being intercepted and copied on the way to the graphics card. It is complementary to PVP Output Protection Management.

=== Possible bypass ===
In January 2007 the developer Alex Ionescu announced that he had found a method that allows end users to bypass Vista's Protected Media Path. This would allow digital content to be played on equipment that does not implement DRM restriction measures (like rescaling of video resolutions and disabling analog audio outputs). However, he did not release any source code in fear of a Microsoft lawsuit regarding possible violation of the DMCA. On 6 March 2007, Microsoft responded after internal testing that the described method would not work.

== Criticism ==
In addition to common criticisms against DRM schemes, there has been speculation that this scheme has been motivated by the fact that it would affect official free/open source graphics driver support by manufacturers. The scheme relies on the internals of graphics cards to tell whether the hardware is trustworthy (permitted to play copy-protected content). This could be subverted if an attacker knows certain details about the hardware's operation, which could be disclosed by hardware documentation or open source device drivers. However, this will not affect platform independency, as the scheme is provided with no charge.

Microsoft has frequently been accused of adding the Protected Media Path feature to Vista to block customers from copying rightfully owned media content (a practice believed to be protected by Fair Use provisions of the Copyright Act), and the feature is widely quoted as an example of Microsoft's uncompromising adherence to DRM.

These accusations have never gained much traction largely because Vista treats non-DRM media exactly the same as previous versions of Windows, and that following Vista's release there has been no change in the availability of free/open source drivers from graphics hardware manufacturers.

== See also ==
- Analog hole
- Bus encryption
- Features new to Windows Vista
- Windows Vista I/O technologies
- Trusted Computing
- Image Constraint Token
