= Video Encoded Invisible Light =

Technology to hide digital information in analog video signals

Video Encoded Invisible Light (VEIL) is a technology for encoding low-bandwidth digital data bitstream in video signal, developed by VEIL Interactive Technologies. VEIL is compatible with multiple formats of video signals, including PAL, SECAM, and NTSC. The technology is based on a steganographically encoded data stream in the luminance of the videosignal.

A recent application of VEIL, the VEIL Rights Assertion Mark (VRAM or V-RAM) is a copy-restriction signal that can be used to ask devices to apply DRM technology. This has been seen as analogous to the broadcast flag. It is also known as "CGMS-A plus VEIL" and "broadcast flag on steroids."

There are two versions of VEIL on the market:

- VEIL-I, or VEIL 1, has raw speed of 120 bits per second. It is used for unidirectional communication (TV→devices) with simple devices or toys, and to deliver coupons with TV advertising. It manipulates the luminance of the video signal in ways difficult to perceive to human eye.
- VEIL-II, or VEIL 2, has speed of 7200-bit/s and is one of the technologies of choice for interactive television, as it allows communication with VEIL servers through devices equipped with backchannels. VEIL-II-capable set-top boxes can communicate with other devices via WiFi, Bluetooth, or other short-range wireless technologies. VEIL 2 manipulates the average luminance of the alternate lines of the signal, where one is slightly raised and the other one is slightly lowered (or vice versa), encoding a bit in every pair of lines.

The symbols (groups of 4 data bits) transmitted by VEIL-II system are encoded as "PN sequences", sequences of 16 "chips". Groups of 4 chips are encoded in pairs of lines. Each line pair is split to 4 parts, where the luminance is raised or lowered (correspondingly vice versa in the other line). In NTSC, 4-bit symbols are encoded in groups of 8 scan lines. With 224 lines per field this equals 112 bits per field, or 7200 bits per second of broadcast. VEIL-II uses scan lines 34 to 258. The PN stands for "pseudo noise" and signifies the 0.5/0.5 relative frequencies of ones and zeroes. In practice, 20 chips per line are preferred, increasing redundancy and allowing for better error detection. The PN encoding is a form of spread spectrum modulation.

Stripping the VEIL signal from the video is supposed to be more difficult than tampering with the VBI, therefore VEIL-I is proposed as a DRM tool. The signal can survive recording to video, and various sorts of digital compression. The detection devices are low-cost and can be used in a range of devices, from toys to cellphones.

== Use in toys ==
The technology was developed for The Batman TV series, for transmitting data from the video on-screen to a line of Batman toys based on the series, supplying them with information about the series and unlocking their hidden capabilities.

For example:

- The Batwave Communicator Handheld Device, when within 10 feet in the line of sight from the TV, will show engine graphics, diagnostics, weapon systems, and enables various games stored in the device.
- Batwave Batman Action Figure will pop wings from its back and light up the emblem on its chest when subjected to the videosignal from the TV.
- Batwave Batmobile with Handheld Device will turn on various LEDs acting as its lights, play sounds, and "capture" various weapons from the show.

This technology is also used in other toys, for example Toby Terrier.

VEIL was used in various ad campaigns for Foster's Lager. The campaign incorporated the use of VEIL decoders inside little figures of the famous cricket players Boon and Shane Warne. The toys would make comments during the cricket matches while in front of the television.

== Other uses ==
As of December 2005, VEIL was proposed as a DRM tool to counter the analog hole, as a technological measure legally enforced by the US Digital Content Security Act. In this regard, it is a more fine-grained successor to Macrovision.

VEIL acts together with CGMS-A signal in the vertical blanking interval, where it is used to encode the Rights Assertion Mark (RAM) signal. The CGMS-A can be stripped too easily from the analog signal, therefore the presence of RAM but absence of CGMS-A will tell the copy protection system to deny the copy.
