= CNR =

CNR may stand for:

== Arts, entertainment and media ==
- China National Radio, the national radio station of the People's Republic of China
- CNR Music, a Dutch record and video/DVD label
- "CNR", a song about Charles Nelson Reilly by "Weird Al" Yankovic on the 2009 album Internet Leaks
- Cartoon Network Racing, a racing video game for the PlayStation 2 and Nintendo DS

== Businesses and organisations ==
- Canadian National Railway (CN), formerly Canadian National Railways (CNR)
- CNR Group, the China Northern Locomotive & Rolling Stock Industry (Group) Corporation
  - China CNR, a Chinese railway equipment manufacturer
- Rausser College of Natural Resources at the University of California, Berkeley
- College of New Rochelle, Catholic college based in New Rochelle, New York, U.S.
- College of Natural Resources (Bhutan)
- Compagnie Nationale du Rhône, a French electricity generating company
- Council of National Representatives, governing body of International Council of Nurses
- Czech National Council, Česká národní rada (ČNR), former legislative body of the Czech Republic
- National Council of the Resistance, Conseil national de la Résistance, World War II French organisation
- National Council of European Resistance (French: Conseil National de la Résistance Européenne), French political organization
- National Research Council (Italy), Consiglio Nazionale delle Ricerche, Italian national research council
- Romanian National Committee (Romanian: Comitetul Național Român), the name of several organisations

== People ==
- Charles Nelson Reilly (1931–2007), American actor, comedian, director
- C. N. R. Rao (born 1934), solid state scientist

== Science and technology ==
- CNR (software), formerly software for Linux
- Carrier-to-noise ratio, the signal-to-noise ratio of a modulated signal
- Chief of Naval Research, in the U.S. Navy
- Cisco Network Registrar, software
- Communications and networking riser, a PC motherboard slot
- Combat-net radio
- Contrast-to-noise ratio, a measure used to determine image quality

== Other uses ==
- CNR Yenişehir Exhibition Center, Mersin, Turkey
- cnr, ISO 639-3 and ISO 639-2 code for Montenegrin language
- Catholic, nationalist, republican community in Northern Ireland

== See also ==
- CNR Bridge (disambiguation)
- Cops and Robbers (disambiguation)
- List of colleges of natural resources
