= Copy Control Information =

Digital television stream copying rights

Copy Control Information (CCI) is a two byte flag included in digital television streams that allows content owners and cable operators to specify how content can be duplicated. Originally defined as part of the 5C copy protection specification devised by DTCP working group back in 1998, it was later defined as part of the FCC's Plug and Play agreement in 2003.

The two most used flags used are Copy Freely and Copy Once. Copy Freely is essentially no flag at all, while Copy Once means that a DVR can make one copy, but no more copies can be made. DVR platforms such as TiVo and Windows Media Center are responsible for reading the flag, decrypting the stream if necessary and storing the content in a way that enforces the flag set. A show that is marked Copy Once cannot be transferred to another TiVo via the Multi-Room Viewing feature and can not be transferred to the computer via TiVoToGo. In regard to Windows Media Center, shows marked Copy Once can only be played on the same PC in which they were recorded and the directly connected Extenders for Media Center like the Xbox 360—ATI Digital Cable Tuner must be running firmware 1.19.12 or Copy Freely is treated like Copy Once.

The following flags exist:

- 0x00 - Copy freely - Content is not copy protected.
- 0x01 - Copy No More - A copy of the content has already occurred and no more copies are permitted.†
- 0x02 - Copy Once - One recording can be made, but it cannot be copied to another device.†
- 0x03 - Copy Never - the content can be recorded and viewed for 90 minutes after transmission, and is not transferable.†
- 0x04 - Content is Copy Once for digital output, but would have Macrovision 7 Day Unlimited restriction applied on the analog outputs. This affects content viewed either on an HDTV with component cabling or on a standard definition TV. It also affects content saved to VCR or DVD when the recorder is connected to an analog output on the DVR.†
- 0x07 - Content is Copy Never for digital content (deleted after 90 minutes) and Macrovision 7 day/24 hour for content recorded from analog channels. Content cannot be transferred via TiVoToGo transfers or MRV, and cannot be saved to VCR or DVD.†

† - Any live stream with a CCI flag set higher than 0x00 is to be encrypted or protected in a way that only trusted platforms that will obey the flag (Such as Microsoft's PlayReady system used in Windows Media center) can access it.

The application of the CCI flag was specified on page 30 of the FCC Plug and Play agreement. In the order, it is specified that over-the-air broadcast television channels must be set to Copy Freely and that non-premium subscription programming can be set to either Copy Once or Copy Freely. This is determined by the cable television provider and can vary from one market to the next (even if both markets are served by the same company). Some operators tend to set all programs as Copy Once, preventing further distribution after a single PVR recording, and others tend to set all programs as Copy Freely.

== See also ==
- Selectable Output Control
- CGMS-A
- Broadcast flag
- Image Constraint Token
- Serial Copy Management System
