= DVB-CPCM =

Digital rights management standard

DVB Content Protection & Copy Management (DVB-CPCM or CPCM) is a digital rights management standard being developed by the DVB Project. Its main application is interoperable rights management of European digital television, though other countries may also adopt the standard.

== How it works ==
CPCM specifies a way of adding information to digital content, such as television programs, to describe how and if content may be used and shared among other CPCM-enabled devices.

Content providers can use a range of flags stored with the content to describe how it may be used. All CPCM-enabled devices should obey these flags. These flags can allow or deny content to be either moved or copied to other CPCM devices. Content may also be provided for a set time limit, or forbid content to be played concurrently on separate devices.

=== Domains ===
CPCM can distinguish between devices inside and outside an "authorized domain" of devices. The authorized domain can include devices both in the home or in remote locations such as cars or vacation homes. It also specifies whether content should remain inside the home (the "local environment") or inside a physical region, such as a country (the "geographic area").

=== Robustness requirement ===
CPCM (as do all content protection mechanisms used for pay TV) contains a "robustness requirement" that demands that manufacturers design their technologies to resist end-user modification, which makes it impossible to implement a fully trusted CPCM in user-modifiable software like Linux.

Unlike most DRM systems, CPCM (in theory) supports a choice of robustness regimes rather than tying everyone to a single set of conditions. It is possible that different regimes may emerge e.g. distinct trust models for pay TV, free TV, or even public domain type content. Each of these could have appropriate levels of robustness requirement. It would even be possible to define a CPCM C&R regime that permits implementation in user-modifiable software, though this would probably not be trusted to receive content from most commercial services.

At this time no regime has been announced, so any restrictions have yet to be identified

=== Related technology ===
==== Broadcast Flag ====
CPCM is sometimes compared to the failed U.S. broadcast flag: the DVB has now defined signals within the DVB Service Information (DVB-SI) which allow a free-to-air broadcaster to signal correct behaviour for content protection systems such as CPCM. These signals are not specific to use with CPCM, and can also be used to control HDCP or similar systems. However, CPCM does defined an exact mapping of these SI signals to the CPCM usage state information. See https://web.archive.org/web/20060927002425/http://www.dvb.org/technology/dvb-cpcm/ for further information.

Europe does not have a single regulating authority like the FCC, so an exact parallel to the enforcement rules of the failed US approach is unlikely.

==== HDCP and DTCP-IP ====
HDCP protects a single wire connection, typically DVI or HDMI. CPCM is network independent and can be used on LAN, WiFi, and in theory even on IEEE 1394 FireWire links.

DTCP-IP is a link protection system similar to HDCP, but operates over a LAN or WLAN connection.

Both HDCP and DTCP-IP are link protection "render and toss" technologies that generally prohibit the receiving device from recording or redistributing the content. Also, both are designed to prevent connection of devices that are not in close proximity to one another. CPCM by contrast can allow for recording and/or remote access depending on the specific rights granted with the content.

== Publication ==
The normative sections have now all been approved for publication by the DVB Steering Board, and will be published by ETSI as a formal European Standard as ETSI TS 102 825-X where X refers to the Part number of specification.

Nobody has yet stepped forward to provide a Compliance and Robustness regime for the standard (though several are rumoured to be in development), so it is not presently possible to fully implement a system, as there is nowhere to obtain the necessary device certificates.

== See also ==
- CI+
