= Havi =

Havi may refer to:

- Hávi, a variant form of Hár, one of the names of Odin, the chief god in Norse mythology
- HAVi, the Home Audio Video Interoperability standard
