= Video Content Protection System =

The Video Content Protection System (VCPS) is a standard for digital rights management, intended to enforce protection or DVD+R/+RW content and related media. It was designed to protect video recordings broadcast terrestrially with the broadcast flag used for digital high-definition programming, but its use has been expanded to cover programming obtained in other ways, such as via cable and satellite delivery. This standard is promoted by Philips and is included in latest Scsi MMC-6 specification.

The system makes use of three different classes of encryption key, one type stored on the media in a "Disc Key Block", one stored in player software, and one in any hardware device that will be used to play (and hence decrypt) the media.

== HP and Phillips Proposal ==
Hewlett-Packard and Philips have "discussed how they are trying to develop a content-protection system for DVDs, designed to protect users from burning 'protected' DTV broadcasts." Existing DVD players would not be able to read DVDs which incorporate the technology.
