= Content Protection Status Report =

The Content Protection Status Report is the title of a series of three documents submitted to the United States Senate Committee on the Judiciary during 2002 by the Motion Picture Association of America. (The Senate Judiciary Committee has jurisdiction over, and regularly holds hearings related to, U.S. copyright law.) In these documents, the MPAA discusses its progress in devising, and getting technology firms to adopt, digital rights management and recording controls for consumer technology products.

The Status Report also proposes, in general terms, legislation related to three areas of concern to the MPAA in 2002:

- The ATSC broadcast flag
- The analog hole
- Peer-to-peer file sharing

The original documents remain available from the Senate Judiciary Committee's web site:

- http://judiciary.senate.gov/special/content_protection.pdf Content Protection Status Report
- https://web.archive.org/web/20050903004220/http://judiciary.senate.gov/special/mpaa_june.pdf Content Protection Status Report II
- https://web.archive.org/web/20050527202214/http://judiciary.senate.gov/special/mpaa110702.pdf Content Protection Status Report III
