= Graphics card =

Expansion card which generates a feed of output images to a display device

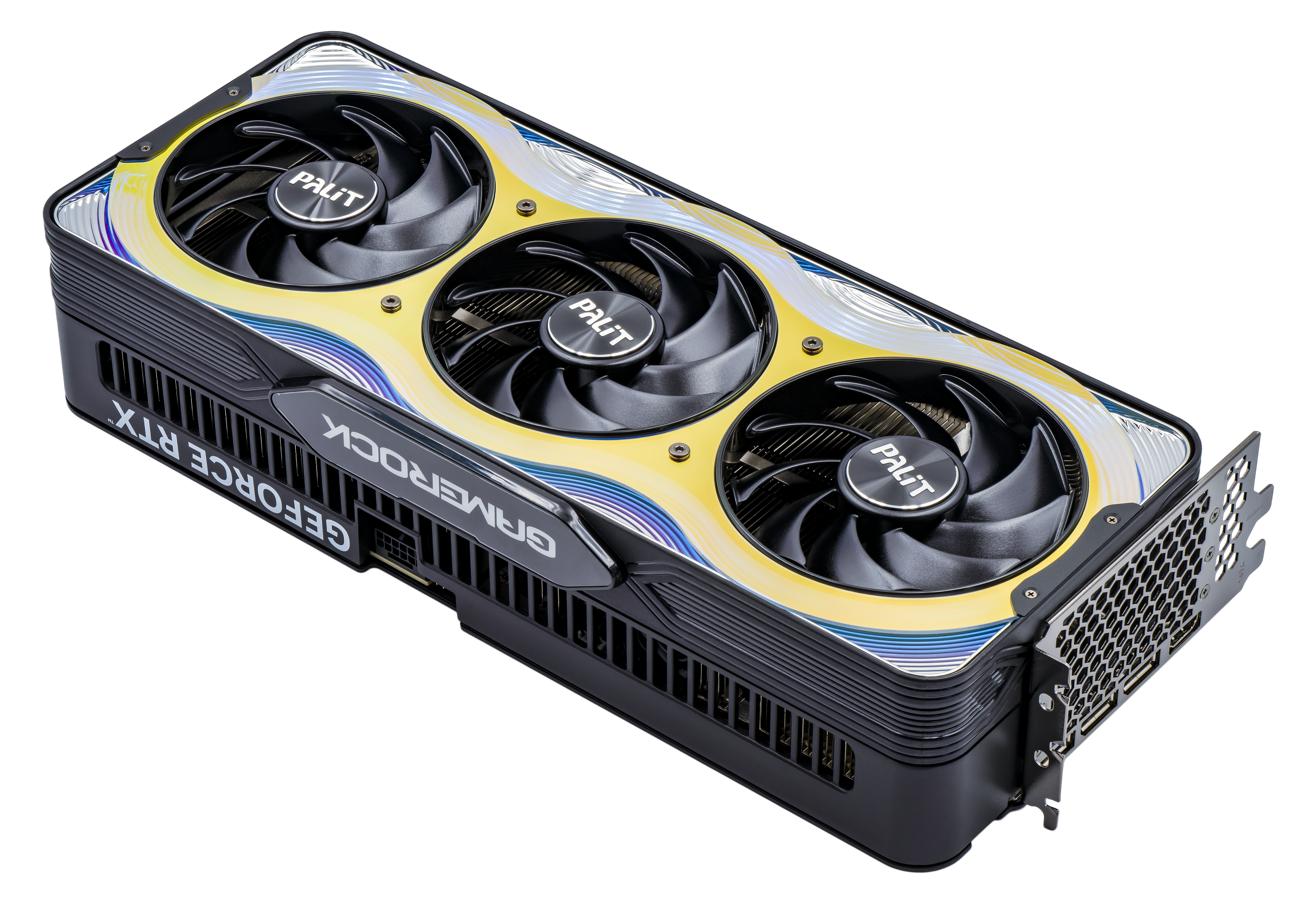
A modern high-end consumer graphics card: a Custom Edition GeForce RTX 5090 from Palit Microsystems

A graphics card, also known as a video card or display card, is a computer expansion card that generates a feed of graphics output to a display device such as a monitor. Graphics cards are sometimes called discrete or dedicated graphics cards to emphasize their distinction from an integrated graphics processor on the motherboard or the central processing unit (CPU). A graphics processing unit (GPU) that performs the necessary computations is the main component in a graphics card, but the acronym "GPU" is often used in common parlance to refer to the graphics card as a whole.

Most graphics cards are not limited to simple display output. The graphics processing unit can be used for additional processing, which reduces the load from the CPU. Additionally, computing platforms such as DirectCompute, OpenCL and CUDA allow using graphics cards for general-purpose computing. Applications of general-purpose computing on graphics cards include AI training, cryptocurrency mining, and molecular simulation.

Usually, a graphics card comes in the form of a printed circuit board (expansion board) which is to be inserted into an expansion slot. Others may have dedicated enclosures, and they are connected to the computer via a docking station or a cable. These are known as external GPUs (eGPUs).

Graphics cards are often preferred over integrated graphics for increased performance. A more powerful graphics card will be able to render more frames per second.

== History ==
Graphics cards have historically evolved alongside computer display standards to accommodate advancing technologies and user demands. In the realm of IBM PC compatibles, the early standards included Monochrome Display Adapter (MDA), Color Graphics Adapter (CGA), Hercules Graphics Card, Enhanced Graphics Adapter (EGA), and Video Graphics Array (VGA). Each of these standards represented a step forward in the ability of computers to display more colors, higher resolutions, and richer graphical interfaces, laying the foundation for the development of modern graphical capabilities.

In the late 1980s, advancements in personal computing led companies like Radius to develop specialized graphics cards for the Apple Macintosh II. These cards were unique in that they incorporated discrete 2D QuickDraw capabilities, enhancing the graphical output of Macintosh computers by accelerating 2D graphics rendering. QuickDraw, a core part of the Macintosh graphical user interface, allowed for the rapid rendering of bitmapped graphics, fonts, and shapes, and the introduction of such hardware-based enhancements signaled an era of specialized graphics processing in consumer machines.

The evolution of graphics processing took a major leap forward in the mid-1990s with 3dfx Interactive's introduction of the Voodoo series, one of the earliest consumer-facing GPUs that supported 3D acceleration. The Voodoo's architecture marked a major shift in graphical computing by offloading the demanding task of 3D rendering from the CPU to the GPU, significantly improving gaming performance and graphical realism.

The development of fully integrated GPUs that could handle both 2D and 3D rendering came with the introduction of Nvidia's RIVA 128. Released in 1997, the RIVA 128 was one of the first consumer-facing GPUs to integrate both 3D and 2D processing units on a single chip. This innovation simplified the hardware requirements for end-users, as they no longer needed separate cards for 2D and 3D rendering, thus paving the way for the widespread adoption of more powerful and versatile GPUs in personal computers.

In contemporary times, the majority of graphics cards are built using chips sourced from three dominant manufacturers: AMD, Intel and Nvidia. These modern graphics cards are multifunctional and support various tasks beyond rendering 3D images for gaming. They also provide 2D graphics processing, video decoding, TV output, and multi-monitor setups. Additionally, many graphics cards now have integrated sound capabilities, allowing them to transmit audio alongside video output to connected TVs or monitors with built-in speakers, further enhancing the multimedia experience.

Within the graphics industry, these products are often referred to as graphics add-in boards (AIBs). The term "AIB" emphasizes the modular nature of these components, as they are typically added to a computer's motherboard to enhance its graphical capabilities. The evolution from the early days of separate 2D and 3D cards to today's integrated and multifunctional GPUs reflects the ongoing technological advancements and the increasing demand for high-quality visual and multimedia experiences in computing.

== Discrete vs integrated graphics ==
Classical desktop computer architecture with a distinct graphics card over PCI Express. Typical bandwidths for given memory technologies, missing are the memory latency. Zero-copy between GPU and CPU is not possible, since both have their distinct physical memories. Data must be copied from one to the other to be shared.

Integrated graphics with partitioned main memory: a part of the system memory is allocated to the GPU exclusively. Zero-copy is not possible, data has to be copied, over the system memory bus, from one partition to the other.

Integrated graphics with unified main memory, to be found AMD "Kaveri" or PlayStation 4 (HSA)

As an alternative to the use of a graphics card, video hardware can be integrated into the motherboard, CPU, or a system-on-chip as integrated graphics. Motherboard-based implementations are sometimes called "on-board video". Some motherboards support using both integrated graphics and a graphics card simultaneously to feed separate displays. The main advantages of integrated graphics are: low cost, compactness, simplicity, and low energy consumption. Integrated graphics often have less performance than a graphics card because the graphics processing unit inside integrated graphics needs to share system resources with the CPU. On the other hand, a graphics card has separate random access memory (RAM), its own cooling system, and dedicated power regulators. A graphics card can offload work and reduce memory-bus-contention from the CPU and system RAM, therefore, the overall performance for a computer could improve, in addition to increased performance in graphics processing. Such improvements to performance can be seen in video gaming, 3D animation, and video editing.

Both AMD and Intel have introduced CPUs and motherboard chipsets that support the integration of a GPU into the same die as the CPU. AMD advertises CPUs with integrated graphics under the trademark Accelerated Processing Unit (APU), while Intel brands similar technology under "Intel Graphics Technology".

== Power demand ==
As the processing power of graphics cards increased, so did their demand for electrical power. Current high-performance graphics cards tend to consume large amounts of power. For example, the thermal design power (TDP) for the GeForce Titan RTX is 280 watts. When tested with video games, the GeForce RTX 2080 Ti Founder's Edition averaged 300 watts of power consumption. While CPU and power supply manufacturers have recently aimed toward higher efficiency, power demands of graphics cards continued to rise, with the largest power consumption of any individual part in a computer. Although power supplies have also increased their power output, the bottleneck occurs in the PCI-Express connection, which is limited to supplying 75 watts.

Modern graphics cards with a power consumption of over 75 watts usually include a combination of six-pin (75 W) or eight-pin (150 W) sockets that connect directly to the power supply. Providing adequate cooling becomes a challenge in such computers. Computers with multiple graphics cards may require power supplies over 750 watts. Heat extraction becomes a major design consideration for computers with two or more high-end graphics cards.

As of the Nvidia GeForce RTX 30 series, Ampere architecture, a custom flashed RTX 3090 named "Hall of Fame" has been recorded to reach a peak power draw as high as 630 watts. A standard RTX 3090 can peak at up to 450 watts. The RTX 3080 can reach up to 350 watts, while a 3070 can reach a similar, if not slightly lower, peak power draw. Ampere cards of the Founders Edition variant feature a "dual axial flow through" cooler design, which includes fans above and below the card to dissipate as much heat as possible towards the rear of the computer case. A similar design was used by the Sapphire Radeon RX Vega 56 Pulse graphics card.

== Size ==
Graphics cards for desktop computers have different size profiles, which allows graphics cards to be added to smaller-sized computers. Some graphics cards are not of the usual size, and are named as "low profile". Graphics card profiles are based on height only, with low-profile cards taking up less than the height of a PCIe slot. Length and thickness can vary greatly, with high-end cards usually occupying two or three expansion slots, and with modern high-end graphics cards such as the RTX 4090 exceeding 300mm in length. A lower profile card is preferred when trying to fit multiple cards or if graphics cards run into clearance issues with other motherboard components like the DIMM or PCIE slots. This can be fixed with a larger computer case such as mid-tower or full tower. Full towers are usually able to fit larger motherboards in sizes like ATX and micro ATX.

== GPU sag ==
Since the late 2010s and early 2020s, some high-end graphics card models have become heavy enough that it is possible for them to sag downwards after installing without proper support, which is why many manufacturers provide additional support brackets. GPU sag can damage a GPU in the long term.

== Multicard scaling ==
Some graphics cards can be linked together to allow scaling graphics processing across multiple cards. This is done using either the PCIe bus on the motherboard or, more commonly, a data bridge. Usually, the cards must be of the same model to be linked, and most low end cards are not able to be linked in this way. AMD and Nvidia both have proprietary scaling methods, CrossFireX for AMD, and SLI (since the Turing generation, superseded by NVLink) for Nvidia. Cards from different chip-set manufacturers or architectures cannot be used together for multi-card scaling. If graphics cards have different sizes of memory, the lowest value will be used, with the higher values disregarded. Currently, scaling on consumer-grade cards can be done using up to four cards. The use of four cards requires a large motherboard with a proper configuration. Nvidia's GeForce GTX 590 graphics card can be configured in a four-card configuration. As stated above, users will want to stick to cards with the same performances for optimal use. Motherboards including ASUS Maximus 3 Extreme and Gigabyte GA EX58 Extreme are certified to work with this configuration. A large power supply is necessary to run the cards in SLI or CrossFireX. Power demands must be known before a proper supply is installed. For the four card configuration, a 1000+ watt supply is needed. With any relatively powerful graphics card, thermal management cannot be ignored. Graphics cards require well-vented chassis and good thermal solutions. Air or water cooling are usually required, though low end GPUs can use passive cooling. Larger configurations use water solutions or immersion cooling to achieve proper performance without thermal throttling.

SLI and Crossfire became increasingly uncommon as most games do not fully utilize multiple GPUs, due to the fact that most users cannot afford them. Multiple GPUs are still used on supercomputers (like in Summit), on workstations to accelerate video and 3D rendering, visual effects, for simulations, and for training artificial intelligence.

== 3D graphics APIs ==
A graphics driver usually supports one or multiple cards by the same vendor and has to be written for a specific operating system. Additionally, the operating system or an extra software package may provide certain programming APIs for applications to perform 3D rendering.

3D rendering API availability across operating systems
OS	Vulkan	Direct3D	Metal	OpenGL	OpenGL ES	OpenCL
Windows	Yes	Microsoft	No	Yes	Yes	Yes
macOS, iOS and iPadOS	MoltenVK	No	Apple	MacOS	iOS/iPadOS	Apple
Linux	Yes	Alternative; Implementations	No	Yes	Yes	Yes
Android	Yes	No	No	Nvidia	Yes	Yes
Tizen	In development	No	No	No	Yes	—N/a
Sailfish OS	In development	No	No	No	Yes	—N/a

== Usage ==
GPUs are designed with specific usages in mind, such product lines are categorized here :

1. Gaming
  - GeForce GTX
  - GeForce RTX
  - Nvidia Titan
  - Radeon HD
  - Radeon RX
  - Intel Arc ( Desktop )
2. Cloud gaming
  - Nvidia Grid
  - Radeon Sky
3. Workstation
  - Nvidia Quadro
  - AMD FirePro
  - Radeon Pro
  - Intel Arc Pro
4. Cloud Workstation
  - Nvidia Tesla
  - AMD FireStream
5. Artificial Intelligence Cloud
  - Nvidia Tesla
  - Radeon Instinct
6. Automated/Driverless car
  - Nvidia Drive PX

== Industry ==
As of 2025, the primary suppliers of the GPUs (graphics chips or chipsets) used in graphics cards are AMD and Nvidia. In the third quarter of 2013, AMD had a 35.5% market share while Nvidia had 64.5%, according to Jon Peddie Research. In economics, this industry structure is termed a duopoly. AMD and Nvidia also build and sell graphics cards, which are termed graphics add-in-boards (AIBs) in the industry. (See Comparison of Nvidia graphics processing units and Comparison of AMD graphics processing units.) In addition to marketing their own graphics cards, AMD and Nvidia sell their GPUs to authorized AIB suppliers, which AMD and Nvidia refer to as "partners". The fact that Nvidia and AMD compete directly with their customer/partners complicates relationships in the industry. AMD and Intel being direct competitors in the CPU industry is also noteworthy, since AMD-based graphics cards may be used in computers with Intel CPUs. Intel's integrated graphics may weaken AMD, in which the latter derives a significant portion of its revenue from its APUs. As of the second quarter of 2013, there were 52 AIB suppliers. These AIB suppliers may market graphics cards under their own brands, produce graphics cards for private label brands, or produce graphics cards for computer manufacturers. Some AIB suppliers such as MSI build both AMD-based and Nvidia-based graphics cards. Others, such as EVGA, build only Nvidia-based graphics cards, while XFX, now builds only AMD-based graphics cards. Several AIB suppliers are also motherboard suppliers. Most of the largest AIB suppliers are based in Taiwan and they include ASUS, MSI, GIGABYTE, and Palit. Hong Kong–based AIB manufacturers include Sapphire and Zotac. Sapphire and Zotac also sell graphics cards exclusively for AMD and Nvidia GPUs respectively.

== Market ==
Graphics card shipments peaked at a total of 114 million in 1999. By contrast, they totaled 14.5 million units in the third quarter of 2013, a 17% fall from Q3 2012 levels. Shipments reached an annual total of 44 million in 2015. The sales of graphics cards have trended downward due to improvements in integrated graphics technologies; high-end, CPU-integrated graphics can provide competitive performance with low-end graphics cards. At the same time, graphics card sales have grown within the high-end segment, as manufacturers have shifted their focus to prioritize the gaming and enthusiast market.

Beyond the gaming and multimedia segments, graphics cards have been increasingly used for general-purpose computing, such as big data processing. The growth of cryptocurrency has placed a severely high demand on high-end graphics cards, especially in large quantities, due to their advantages in the process of cryptocurrency mining. In January 2018, mid- to high-end graphics cards experienced a major surge in price, with many retailers having stock shortages due to the significant demand among this market. Graphics card companies released mining-specific cards designed to run 24 hours a day, seven days a week, and without video output ports. The graphics card industry took a setback due to the 2020–21 chip shortage.

== Parts ==
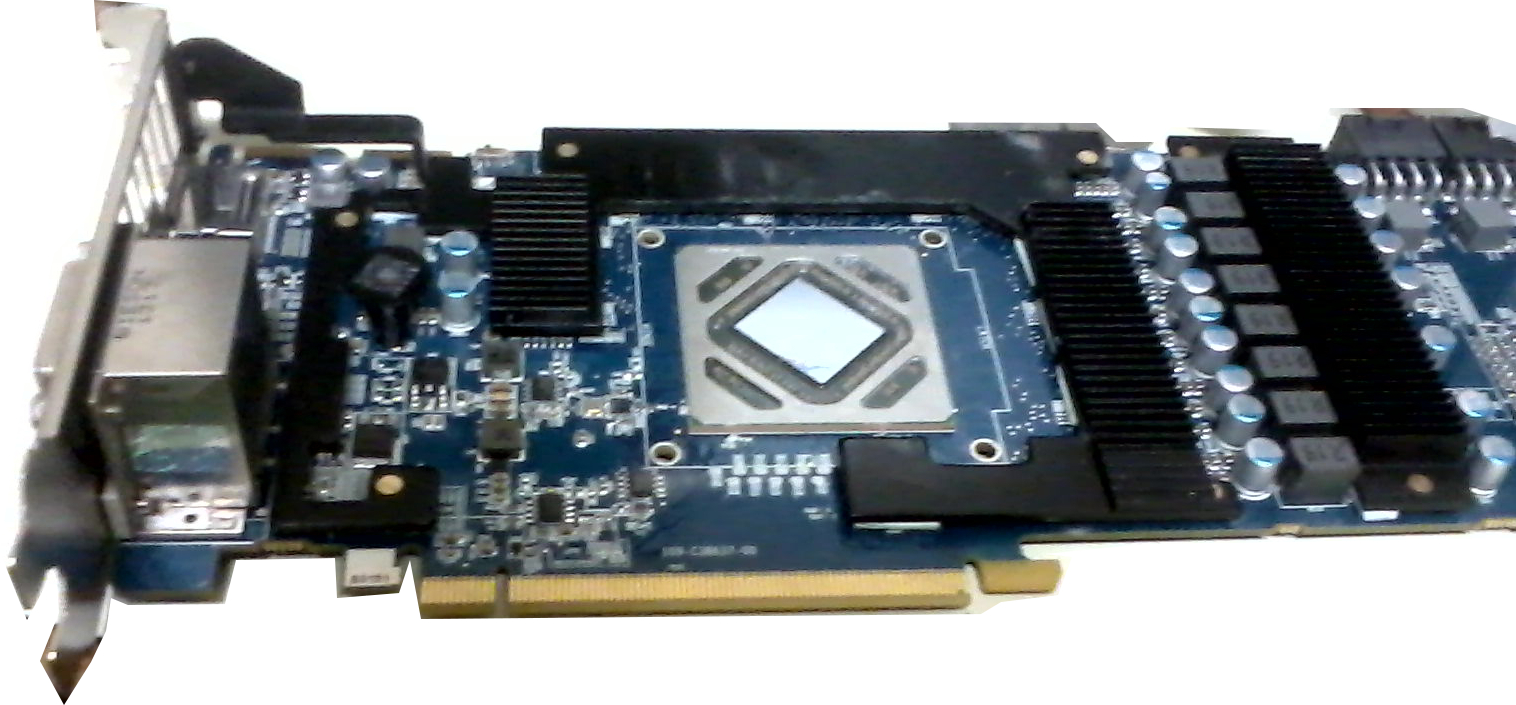
A Radeon HD 7970 with the main heatsink removed, showing the major components of the card. The large, tilted silver object is the GPU die, which is surrounded by RAM chips, which are covered in extruded aluminum heatsinks. Power delivery circuitry is mounted next to the RAM, near the right side of the card.

A modern graphics card consists of a printed circuit board on which the components are mounted. These include:

=== Graphics processing unit ===
A graphics processing unit (GPU), also occasionally called visual processing unit (VPU), is a specialized electronic circuit designed to rapidly manipulate and alter memory to accelerate the building of images in a frame buffer intended for output to a display. Because of the large degree of programmable computational complexity for such a task, a modern graphics card is also a computer unto itself.

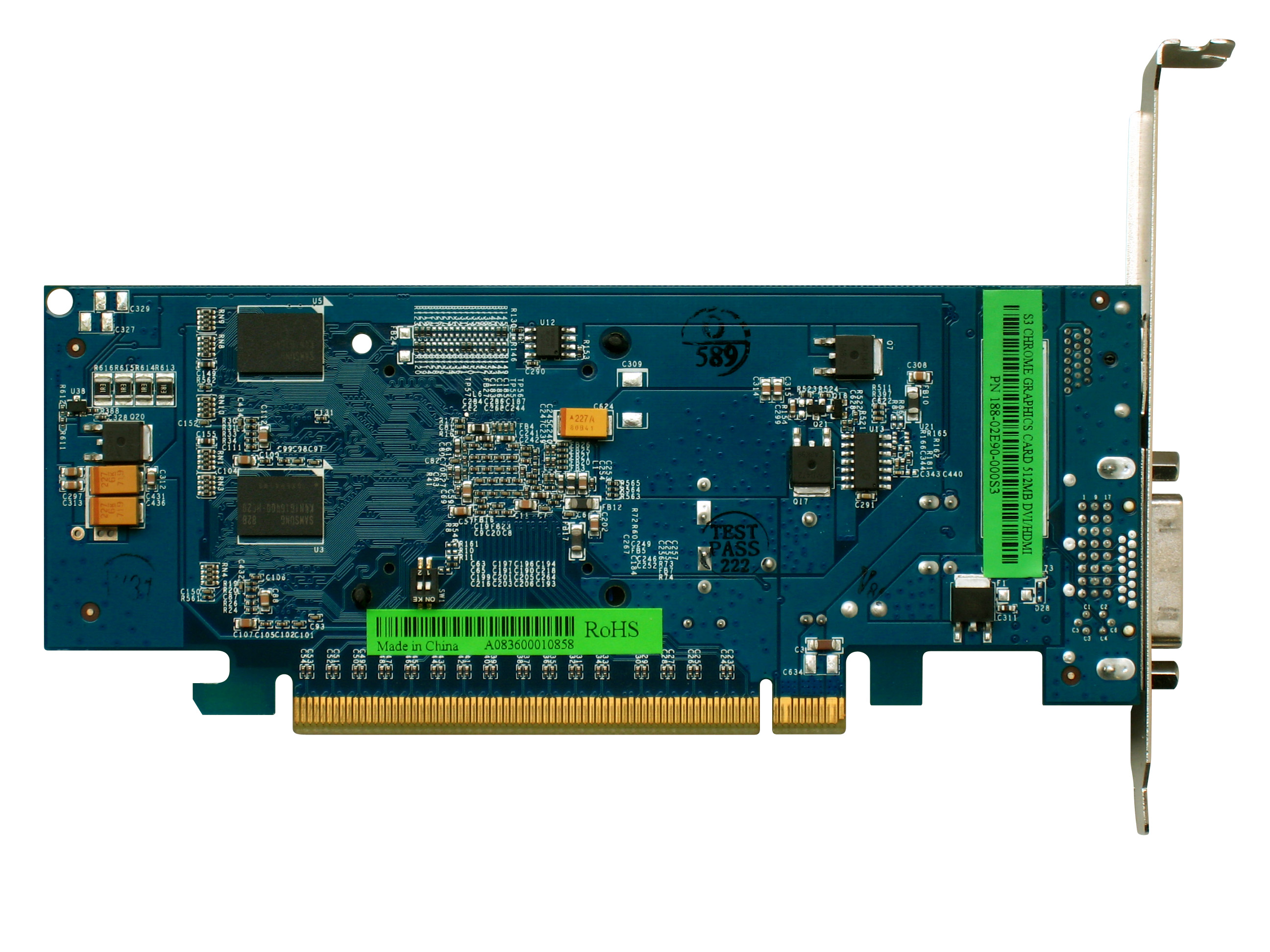
A half-height graphics card

=== Heat sink ===
A heat sink is mounted on most modern graphics cards. A heat sink spreads out the heat produced by the graphics processing unit evenly throughout the heat sink and unit itself. The heat sink commonly has a fan mounted to cool the heat sink and the graphics processing unit. Not all cards have heat sinks, for example, some cards are liquid-cooled and instead have a water block; additionally, cards from the 1980s and early 1990s did not produce much heat, and did not require heat sinks. Most modern graphics cards need proper thermal solutions. They can be water-cooled or through heat sinks with additional connected heat pipes usually made of copper for the best thermal transfer.

=== Video BIOS ===
The video BIOS or firmware contains a minimal program for the initial set up and control of the graphics card. It may contain information on the memory and memory timing, operating speeds and voltages of the graphics processor, and other details which can sometimes be changed.

Modern Video BIOSes do not support full functionalities of graphics cards; they are only sufficient to identify and initialize the card to display one of a few frame buffer or text display modes. It does not support YUV to RGB translation, video scaling, pixel copying, compositing or any of the multitude of other 2D and 3D features of the graphics card, which must be accessed by software drivers.

=== Video memory ===
The memory capacity of most modern graphics cards ranges from 2 to 24 GB. But with up to 32 GB as of the late 2010s, the applications for graphics use are becoming more powerful and widespread. Since video memory needs to be accessed by the GPU and the display circuitry, it often uses special high-speed or multi-port memory, such as VRAM, WRAM, SGRAM, etc. Around 2003, the video memory was typically based on DDR technology. During and after that year, manufacturers moved towards DDR2, GDDR3, GDDR4, GDDR5, GDDR5X, GDDR6, and GDDR7. The effective memory clock rate in modern cards is generally between 2 and 15 GHz.

Video memory may be used for storing other data as well as the screen image, such as the Z-buffer, which manages the depth coordinates in 3D graphics, as well as textures, vertex buffers, and compiled shader programs.

=== RAMDAC ===
The RAMDAC, or random-access-memory digital-to-analog converter, converts digital signals to analog signals for use by a computer display that uses analog inputs such as cathode-ray tube (CRT) displays. The RAMDAC is a kind of RAM chip that regulates the functioning of the graphics card. Depending on the number of bits used and the RAMDAC-data-transfer rate, the converter will be able to support different computer-display refresh rates. With CRT displays, it is best to work over 75 Hz and never under 60 Hz, to minimize flicker. (This is not a problem with liquid-crystal displays, as they have little to no flicker.) Due to the growing popularity of digital computer displays and the integration of the RAMDAC onto the GPU die, it has mostly disappeared as a discrete component. All current LCD/plasma monitors and TVs and projectors with only digital connections work in the digital domain and do not require a RAMDAC for those connections. There are displays that feature analog inputs (VGA, component, SCART, etc.) only. These require a RAMDAC, but they reconvert the analog signal back to digital before they can display it, with the unavoidable loss of quality stemming from this digital-to-analog-to-digital conversion. With the VGA standard being phased out in favor of digital formats, RAMDACs have started to disappear from graphics cards.

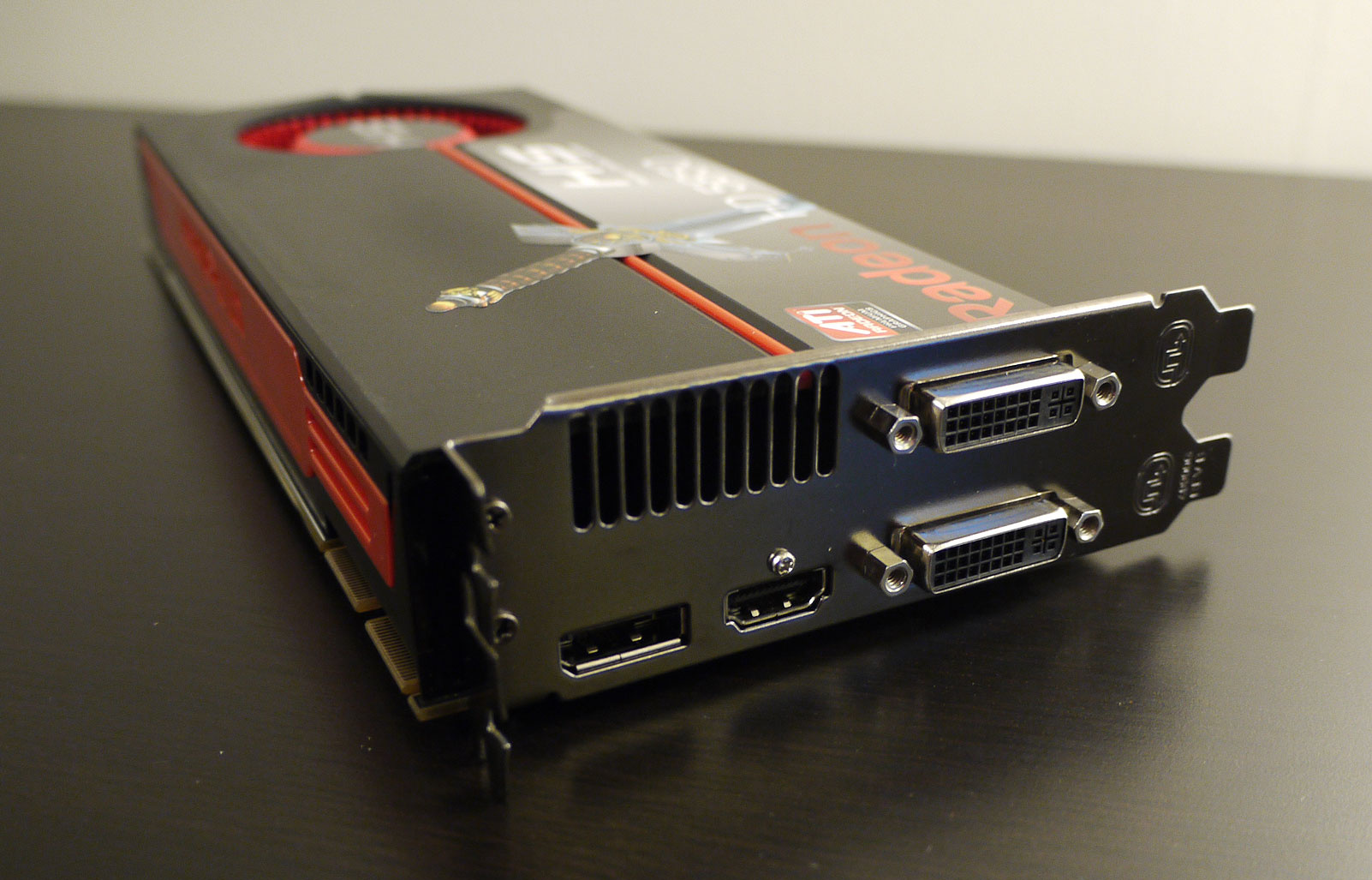
A Radeon HD 5850 with a DisplayPort, HDMI and two DVI ports

=== Output interfaces ===
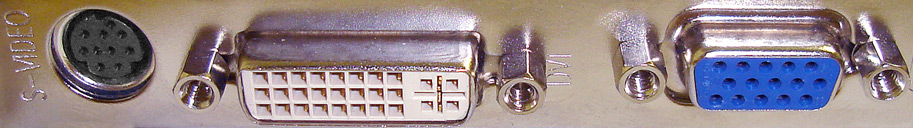
Video-in video-out (VIVO) for S-Video (TV-out), Digital Visual Interface (DVI) for high-definition television (HDTV), and DE-15 for Video Graphics Array (VGA)

The most common connection systems between the graphics card and the computer display are:

==== Video Graphics Array (VGA) (DE-15) ====
Video Graphics Array (DE-15)

Also known as D-sub, VGA is an analog-based standard adopted in the late 1980s designed for CRT displays, also called VGA connector. Today, the VGA analog interface is used for high definition video resolutions including 1080p and higher. Some problems of this standard are electrical noise, image distortion and sampling error in evaluating pixels. While the VGA transmission bandwidth is high enough to support even higher resolution playback, the picture quality can degrade depending on cable quality and length. The extent of quality difference depends on the individual's eyesight and the display; when using a DVI or HDMI connection, especially on larger sized LCD/LED monitors or TVs, quality degradation, if present, is prominently visible. Blu-ray playback at 1080p is possible via the VGA analog interface, if Image Constraint Token (ICT) is not enabled on the Blu-ray disc.

==== Digital Visual Interface (DVI) ====
Digital Visual Interface (DVI-I)

Digital Visual Interface is a digital-based standard designed for displays such as flat-panel displays (LCDs, plasma screens, wide high-definition television displays) and video projectors. There were also some rare high-end CRT monitors that use DVI. It avoids image distortion and electrical noise, corresponding each pixel from the computer to a display pixel, using its native resolution. Most manufacturers include a DVI-I connector, allowing (via simple adapter) standard RGB signal output to an old CRT or LCD monitor with VGA input.

==== Video-in video-out (VIVO) for S-Video, composite video and component video ====
VIVO connector

These connectors are included to allow connection with televisions, DVD players, video recorders and video game consoles. They often come in two 10-pin mini-DIN connector variations, and the VIVO splitter cable generally comes with either 4 connectors (S-Video in and out plus composite video in and out), or 6 connectors (S-Video in and out, component YP_{B}P_{R} out and composite in and out).

==== High-Definition Multimedia Interface (HDMI) ====
High-Definition Multimedia Interface

HDMI is a compact audio/video interface for transferring uncompressed video data and compressed/uncompressed digital audio data from an HDMI-compliant device ("the source device") to a compatible digital audio device, computer monitor, video projector, or digital television. HDMI is a digital replacement for existing analog video standards. HDMI supports copy protection through HDCP.

==== DisplayPort ====
DisplayPort

DisplayPort is a digital display interface developed by the Video Electronics Standards Association (VESA). The interface is primarily used to connect a video source to a display device such as a computer monitor, though it can also be used to transmit audio, USB, and other forms of data. The VESA specification is royalty-free. VESA designed it to replace VGA, DVI, and LVDS. Backward compatibility to VGA and DVI by using adapter dongles enables consumers to use DisplayPort fitted video sources without replacing existing display devices. Although DisplayPort has a greater throughput of the same functionality as HDMI, it is expected to complement the interface, not replace it.

==== USB-C ====
USB-C is an extensible connector used for USB, display port, thunderbolt, power delivery. The USB-C is a 24 pin reversible connector that supersedes previous USB connectors. Some newer graphics cards use USB-C ports for versatility.

==== Other types of connection systems ====
Type	Connector	Description
Composite video		For display on analog systems with SD resolutions (PAL or NTSC) the RCA connector output can be used. The single pin connector carries all resolution, brightness and color information, making it the lowest quality dedicated video connection. Depending on the card the SECAM color system might be supported, along with non-standard modes like PAL 60 or NTSC 50.
S-Video		For display on analog systems with SD resolutions (PAL or NTSC), the S-video cable carries two synchronized signal and ground pairs, termed Y and C, on a four-pin mini-DIN connector. In composite video, the signals co-exist on different frequencies. To achieve this, the luminance signal must be low-pass filtered, dulling the image. As S-Video maintains the two as separate signals, such detrimental low-pass filtering for luminance is unnecessary, although the chrominance signal still has limited bandwidth relative to component video.
7P		Non-standard 7-pin mini-DIN connectors (termed "7P") are used in some computer equipment (PCs and Macs). A 7P socket accepts and is pin compatible with a standard 4-pin S-Video plug. The three extra sockets may be used to supply composite (CVBS), an RGB or YPbPr video signal, or an I²C interface.
8-pin mini-DIN	A MiniDIN-8 Diagram	The 8-pin mini-DIN connector is used in some ATI Radeon video cards.
Component video		It uses three cables, each with an RCA connector (YC_{B}C_{R} for digital component, or YP_{B}P_{R} for analog component); it is used in older projectors, video-game consoles, and DVD players. It can carry SDTV 480i/576i and EDTV 480p/576p resolutions, and HDTV resolutions 720p and 1080i, but not 1080p due to industry concerns about copy protection. Its graphics quality is equivalent to HDMI for the resolutions it carries, but for best performance for Blu-ray, other 1080p sources like PPV, or 4K Ultra HD, a digital display connector is required.
DB13W3		An analog standard once used by Sun Microsystems, SGI and IBM.
DMS-59		A connector that provides a DVI or VGA output on a single connector.
DE-9		The historical connector used by EGA and CGA graphics cards is a female nine-pin D-subminiature (DE-9). The signal standard and pinout are backward-compatible with CGA, allowing EGA monitors to be used on CGA cards and vice versa.

=== Motherboard interfaces ===
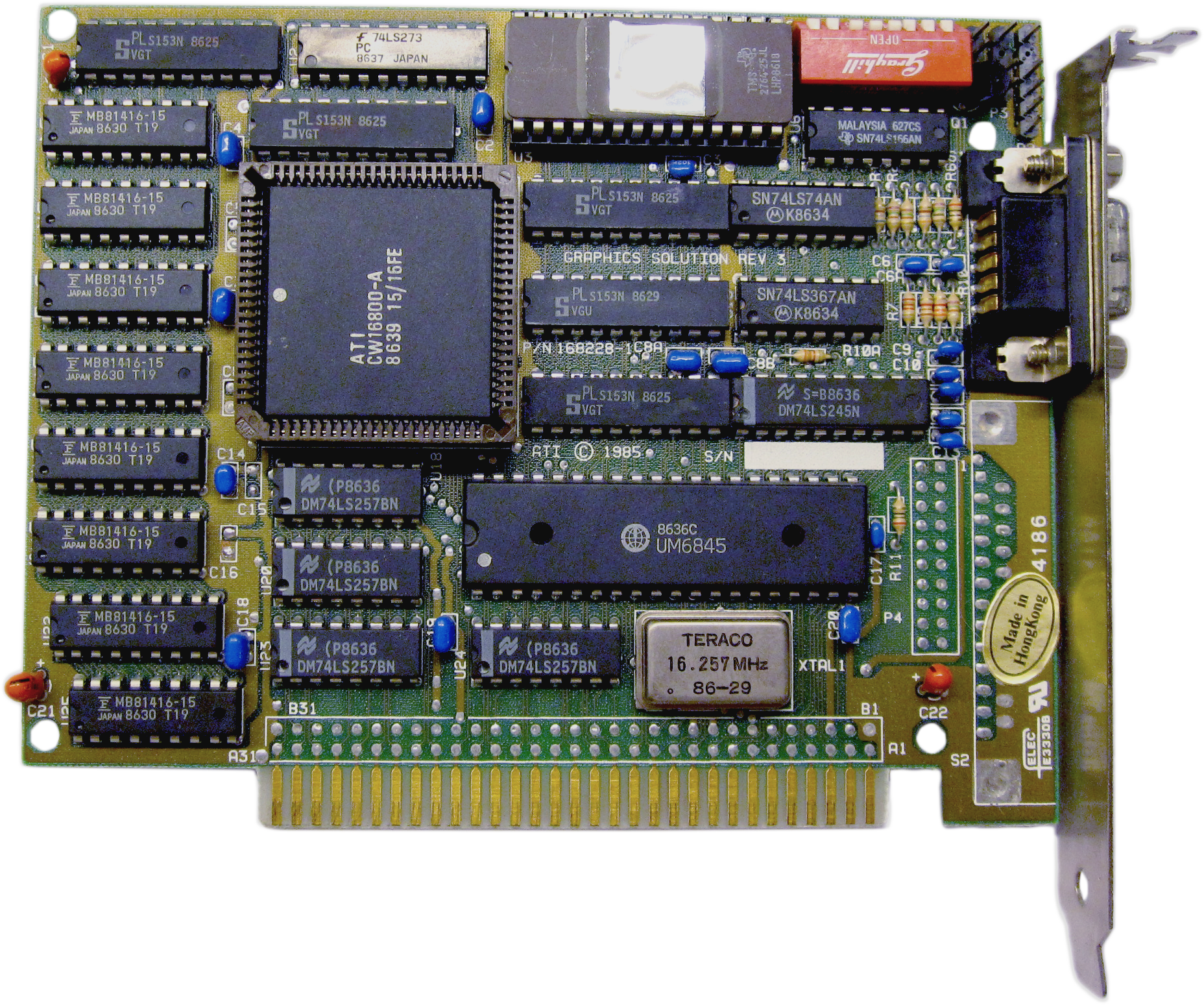
ATI Graphics Solution Rev 3 from 1985/1986, supporting Hercules graphics. As can be seen from the PCB the layout was done in 1985, whereas the marking on the central chip CW16800-A says "8639" meaning that chip was manufactured week 39, 1986. This card is using the ISA 8-bit (XT) interface.

Chronologically, connection systems between graphics card and motherboard were, mainly:

- S-100 bus: Designed in 1974 as a part of the Altair 8800, it is the first industry-standard bus for the microcomputer industry.
- ISA: Introduced in 1981 by IBM, it became dominant in the marketplace in the 1980s. It is an 8- or 16-bit bus clocked at 8 MHz.
- NuBus: Used in Macintosh II, it is a 32-bit bus with an average bandwidth of 10 to 20 MB/s.
- MCA: Introduced in 1987 by IBM it is a 32-bit bus clocked at 10 MHz.
- EISA: Released in 1988 to compete with IBM's MCA, it was compatible with the earlier ISA bus. It is a 32-bit bus clocked at 8.33 MHz.
- VLB: An extension of ISA, it is a 32-bit bus clocked at 33 MHz. Also referred to as VESA.
- PCI: Replaced the EISA, ISA, MCA and VESA buses from 1993 onwards. PCI allowed dynamic connectivity between devices, avoiding the manual adjustments required with jumpers. It is a 32-bit bus clocked 33 MHz.
- UPA: An interconnect bus architecture introduced by Sun Microsystems in 1995. It is a 64-bit bus clocked at 67 or 83 MHz.
- USB: Although mostly used for miscellaneous devices, such as secondary storage devices or peripherals and toys, USB displays and display adapters exist. It was first used in 1996.
- AGP: First used in 1997, it is a dedicated-to-graphics bus. It is a 32-bit bus clocked at 66 MHz.
- PCI-X: An extension of the PCI bus, it was introduced in 1998. It improves upon PCI by extending the width of bus to 64 bits and the clock frequency to up to 133 MHz.
- PCI Express: Abbreviated as PCIe, it is a point-to-point interface released in 2004. In 2006, it provided a data-transfer rate that is double of AGP. It should not be confused with PCI-X, an enhanced version of the original PCI specification. This is standard for most modern graphics cards.

The following table is a comparison between features of some interfaces listed above.

Bus	Width (bits)	Clock rate (MHz)	Bandwidth (MB/s)	Style
ISA XT	8	4.77	8	Parallel
ISA AT	16	8.33	16	Parallel
MCA	32	10	20	Parallel
NUBUS	32	10	10–40	Parallel
EISA	32	8.33	32	Parallel
VESA	32	40	160	Parallel
PCI	32–64	33–100	132–800	Parallel
AGP 1x	32	66	264	Parallel
AGP 2x	32	66	528	Parallel
AGP 4x	32	66	1000	Parallel
AGP 8x	32	66	2000	Parallel
PCIe x1	1	2500 / 5000	250 / 500	Serial
PCIe x4	1 × 4	2500 / 5000	1000 / 2000	Serial
PCIe x8	1 × 8	2500 / 5000	2000 / 4000	Serial
PCIe x16	1 × 16	2500 / 5000	4000 / 8000	Serial
PCIe ×1 2.0	1		500 / 1000	Serial
PCIe ×4 2.0	1 × 4		2000 / 4000	Serial
PCIe ×8 2.0	1 × 8		4000 / 8000	Serial
PCIe ×16 2.0	1 × 16	5000 / 10000	8000 / 16000	Serial
PCIe ×1 3.0	1		1000 / 2000	Serial
PCIe ×4 3.0	1 × 4		4000 / 8000	Serial
PCIe ×8 3.0	1 × 8		8000 / 16000	Serial
PCIe ×16 3.0	1 × 16		16000 / 32000	Serial
PCIe ×1 4.0	1		2000 / 4000	Serial
PCIe ×4 4.0	1 × 4		8000 / 16000	Serial
PCIe ×8 4.0	1 × 8		16000 / 32000	Serial
PCIe ×16 4.0	1 × 16		32000 / 64000	Serial
PCIe ×1 5.0	1		4000 / 8000	Serial
PCIe ×4 5.0	1 × 4		16000 / 32000	Serial
PCIe ×8 5.0	1 × 8		32000 / 64000	Serial
PCIe ×16 5.0	1 × 16		64000 / 128000	Serial

== See also ==
- List of computer hardware
- List of graphics card manufacturers
- List of computer display standards – a detailed list of standards like SVGA, WXGA, WUXGA, etc.
- AMD (ATI), Nvidia – quasi duopoly of 3D chip GPU and graphics card designers
- GeForce, Radeon, Intel Arc – examples of graphics card series
- GPGPU (i.e.: CUDA, AMD FireStream)
- Framebuffer – the computer memory used to store a screen image
- Capture card – the inverse of a graphics card

== Sources ==
- Mueller, Scott (2005) Upgrading and Repairing PCs. 16th edition. Que Publishing. ISBN 0-7897-3173-8
