= CPCM =

CPCM may refer to:

- Certified Professional Contracts Manager (See National Contract Management Association)
- Digital Video Broadcasting Content Protection & Copy Management
- Composite phase change materials (See Thermal composites)
