= MV-Gard =

External videos
- Demonstration and discussion of MV-Gard on YouTube (by VWestlife's Camcorder Tests & More)

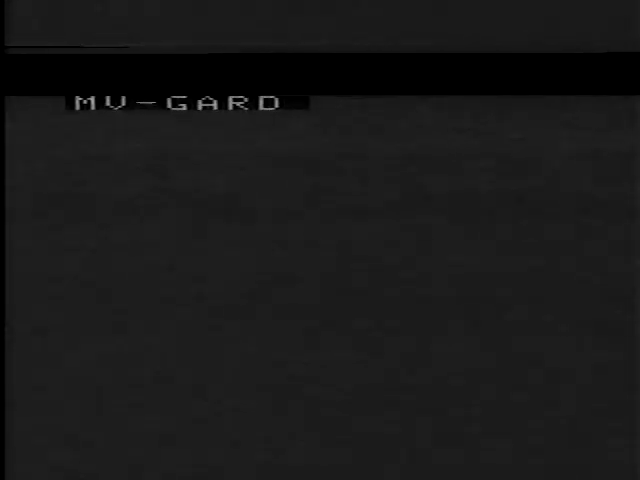
MV-Gard watermark visible in the vertical blanking interval of a 1978 VHS Magnetic Video issue of Modern Times (1936)

MV-Gard (stylized in uppercase) was an early videotape copy protection scheme developed by Magnetic Video Corporation (MVC) in 1978 for use with their home video tapes. MVC, which was the first company to release motion pictures on standalone videotapes for the general public, developed MV-Gard to deter video piracy. It works similarly to Copyguard, the first ever videotape copy protection scheme which was introduced earlier in 1975.

== Background and development ==
MV-Gard was developed by Magnetic Video Corporation (MVC), a manufacturer of magnetic tape media based in the Farmington Hills suburb of Detroit, Michigan. Earlier in 1977, MVC became the first ever company to release motion pictures on standalone videotapes for the general public, after striking a deal with Twentieth Century-Fox in July that year to license fifty of their pre-1972 films for release on VHS and Betamax. Seeing a need to address the illegal duplication of their tapes by bootleg dealers, MVC's co-founder Andre Blay spearheaded the development of a copy protection scheme for his company's tapes. The resulting MV-Gard was unveiled to the public in late August 1978.

The MV-Gard encoding process works by modifying the analog video signal's vertical synchronization pulse within the vertical blanking interval. The signal is modified just enough to remain compatible with standard videocassette recorders, allowing for normal playback on a contemporary VCR and television set. When the same VCR attempts to record this modified signal onto a duplicate tape, however, the VCR is unable to process the modified synchronization pulse effectively. The result is a compromised vertical blanking interval on the pirated copy that falls outside the tolerances of most TV sets. As a result, pirated copies exhibit a complete loss of vertical hold, manifesting as a unwatchable, rolling picture. It works similarly to Copyguard, the first ever videotape copy protection scheme, introduced by Trans-American Video (later Video Duplication, Inc.) in April 1975.

MV-Gard was intended to prevent only amateur piracy efforts. A number of homebrew devices available on the market were capable of circumventing MV-Gard, which Blay acknowledged while introducing it to the public. According to Blay, development of MV-Gard was complicated by the litany of duplication methods that MVC used to manufacture their home video tapes at scale.

At the time of MV-Gard's announcement, Blay simultaneously petitioned the International Tape Association, then the leading industry body of VCR and tape manufacturers, to settle on a standard for videotape copy protection, proposing MV-Gard as the basis. Blay noted that, while MVC had engaged in discussions with all major VCR manufacturers regarding the integration of MV-Gard within the circuitry of their recorders, none of the VCR manufacturers had yet to express interest in videotape copy protection in general. Ron Obsgarten, the president of Video Warehouse who had a competing copy protection scheme by the name of Video-Gard, took umbrage with Blay's approach, opining: "It's not the [VCR] manufacturers' problem. They're charged with building the best machine possible for the public, and as they make better machines, they'll automatically defeat today's encoding systems. It's the responsibility of duplicators, producers [and] distributors".

== Problems and abandonment ==
A few months after MV-Gard's unveiling, it was reported that MVC's videotapes encoded with the scheme were incompatible with several models of TV sets with factory-preset vertical hold settings, as well as newer solid-state sets with automatic vertical hold circuitry. In addition, some of the newest VCRs then on the market had various "trick play" features, such as freeze frame, frame stepping, and visible fast forward, which did not play well with MV-Gard and led to unstable pictures. Many purchasers of MVC's tapes reported rolling pictures during normal playback, despite these tapes being first-generation copies produced from the company's duplication machines. One of MVC's dealers in New Zealand reported that nearly half of the tapes sold since the introduction of MV-Gard were returned by customers as unwatchable. These same issues also plagued Copyguard before it.

While officials from MVC maintained that the issue affected only a small percentage of sets and could be fixed easily with professional servicing, the company petitioned the Electronic Industries Alliance for a long-term technical solution. MVC later started a return program for defective videotapes, with customers receiving tapes clear of any copy protection. In late January 1979, the company rolled out MV-Guard 2, a redesigned scheme which aimed to rectify these issues. Even after the introduction of MV-Gard 2, the film and video collector's magazine Classic Images decried the scheme, calling it technically fraught and prone to obsolescence.

By the early 1980s, a number of VCRs had come out on the market which could circumvent MV-Gard's scheme entirely; as well, standalone video stabilizer devices that connected between the VCR and the TV set which could also thwart MV-Gard had become commonplace. Twentieth Century-Fox, which had purchased MVC in November 1978 and turned it into an autonomous subsidiary, reorganized the company as 20th Century-Fox Video in March 1982, ousting Blay in the process. In June 1982, it formed a joint venture with CBS Video Enterprises and formed as CBS/Fox Video. CBS/Fox eventually abandoned MV-Gard for Macrovision's Analog Protection System in 1986.
