= Selectable Output Control =

Digital rights management technology

Selectable Output Control (SOC) is a content protection Digital Rights Management (DRM) technology that is incorporated into approved devices that enables a Multichannel Video Programming Distributor (MVPD) to disable non-secure audio-video output by encoding the video with a specific signal. SOC aims to limit the output of high definition video over non-secure analog outputs such as component video connections. When enabled, SOC will only output high definition content over a High-Definition Multimedia Interface (HDMI) to devices that are High-bandwidth Digital Content Protection (HDCP) approved. When SOC is enabled for a program, televisions that do not have an HDMI port or are not HDCP compliant will not be able to view content. The U.S. Federal Communications Commission (FCC) had a ban in place on the use of the technology until May 7, 2010, when the FCC granted a limited waiver of Section 76.1903 to allow the use of SOC.

The request for this waiver was filed by the Motion Picture Association of America (MPAA) to allow the use of SOC to broadcast first run movies shortly after theatrical release, but prior to home video release. The MPAA argued that member companies (studios) would not agree to releasing these movies to the On-Demand market without the ability to enforce copy protection, which analog outputs such as component video connections lack, leaving open the ability of users to record analog output. The FCC agreed that it would be in the public interest to allow the use of SOC since it would allow more Americans who may have difficulty getting to the movies the opportunity to enjoy first run movies in the home. The FCC cited an example using homebound parents with young children that may have a hard time getting to the movies due to not being able to find a babysitter. The American Association of People with Disabilities is also in favor of the MPAA's plan to offer high-definition first run movies before home video release because it would increase the entertainment options that disabled Americans have in the home.

The waiver granted by the FCC was limited in that it did not enable all of the actions requested by the MPAA in its waiver application, citing the request as being broad and undefined. According to the FCC waiver on SOC, the following limitations would be placed on the granted waiver:

- There would be an SOC Activation Window Limitation. SOC can only be used for 90 days from the first day it is implemented, or until the movie is available on any pre-recorded media (DVD, Blu-ray Disc), whichever comes first. That way, according to the FCC, owners of legacy HDTVs (those without HDMI connections or HDCP certification) will not lose access to any content that they previously had access to. The FCC's 90-day limitation window is an effort to limit the potential of the MPAA to circumvent the rule by not releasing content on pre-recorded media. For example, as the world moves toward video-on-demand, physical media could become obsolete. In such a case, a movie may never be released on "pre-recorded" media. After 90 days, SOC would be banned from use.
- The Waiver would be reviewed in 2 years. The FCC would review the waiver in two years' time and assess whether the use of SOC has had adverse effects on public interest. However, the FCC left it up to companies that use SOC to file a report. This report was required to contain a summary of all consumer complaints in regard to SOC, the average price charged for first run programming with SOC activated, the average price charged for video-on-demand without SOC activated, detailed box office results prior to and after offering the program on-demand with SOC activated, and whether SOC has been effective in combating piracy during its use. Should SOC have shown to be ineffective at combating piracy, there may be little incentive in using it. In fact, it may be possible that the MPAA member studios could decide against the continued practice of releasing first run movies to the video-on-demand market.
- The approved output devices are HDMI, all digital outputs that CableLabs has approved for unidirectional digital cable products, or any MVPD-approved protected output for Internet Protocol television (IPTV) or Satellite Broadcasters. The intent here is to discourage the development of proprietary output connections by either the MPAA or the MVPD that could hamper competition from third party devices by using standard and/or accepted means of copy protected output.
- Closed Captioning and Video Description should be provided as this is already a requirement that video-on-demand services must be offered with closed captions.
- The FCC included a consumer protection limit with the promise to cancel the waiver should MVPD not implement SOC in a manner that is in accordance with the waiver requirements.

The waiver was not just limited to the MPAA or the MVPDs. According to the waiver "any similarly situated provider of firstrun theatrical content ('similarly situated provider') and its MVPD partners may take advantage of the instant waiver by filing an Election to Participate ('Election') in this proceeding."

As of August 21, 2025, as the result of the FCC's Media Bureau's Order in GN Docket No. 25-133, DA 25-736 ("Delete, Delete, Delete"), Sections 76.1901 through 76.1908 have been deleted from the Commission's rules, meaning a waiver for the now nullified Section 76.1903 is no longer required.

== See also ==
- Copy Control Information
- Broadcast flag
- Image Constraint Token
- Analog Protection System
