= CNR Bridge (disambiguation) =

CNR Bridge is a swing railway bridge over the Fraser River in New Westminster, British Columbia, Canada.

CNR Bridge may also refer to:

- Prince George CNR Bridge, Prince George, British Columbia, Canada
- Cisco Bridges, a pair of railroad bridges at Siska, near Lytton, British Columbia, Canada
- Lytton CNR Fraser Bridge, Lytton, British Columbia, Canada
- Lytton CNR Thompson Bridge, Lytton, British Columbia, Canada
- Vandorf Sideroad CNR Bridge, Whitchurch-Stouffville, Ontario, Canada
- CNR Bonnet Carré Spillway-Baton Rouge Bridge, St. Charles Parish, Louisiana, U.S.
- CNR bridge replaced by the Senator Sid Buckwold Bridge, Saskatoon, Saskatchewan, Canada

== See also ==
- Canadian National Railway
- List of bridges in Canada
