= High-Definition Audio-Video Network Alliance =

The High-Definition Audio-Video Network Alliance (HANA) was a cross-industry collaboration of members addressing the end-to-end needs of connected, HD, home entertainment products and services. Leading companies formed the organization from the four industries most affected by the HD revolution: content providers, consumer electronics, service providers, and information technology. HANA created design guidelines for secure high-definition audio-video networks that would speed the creation of new, high-quality, easy-to-use HD products. HANA membership was open to all companies involved in the digital entertainment industry. HANA was dissolved in September 2009, and the 1394 Trade Association assumed control of all HANA-generated intellectual property.

== Overview ==
HANA was incorporated in October 2005 and formally launched in December 2005. HANA's mission was to provide consumers with a simple way to connect and enjoy HD entertainment anywhere in the home. The organisation's goal was to create standards-based solutions to facilitate the commercial deployment of connected products and services that would enhance the consumer HD entertainment experience.

== Benefits of HANA ==
Consumers
HANA’s focus was to deliver products that would simplify consumers’ lives by eliminating the difficulties associated with connecting and controlling their entertainment devices. Consumers should be able to:
- View, pause, and record more than five HD channels simultaneously with full quality of service (QoS)
- Share personal content between the IT and AV networks while protecting commercial HD content from piracy
- Control all AV devices and access content with just a single remote per room
- Use just a single cable to connect devices rather than multiple cables between all devices
Content providers
By creating a secure home network environment that respects the rights of content owners, multichannel video service providers, and broadcasters, HANA can give consumers flexible and convenient access to more high-value HD content. In particular, the incorporation of digital rights management (DRM) and watermark verification of copyrighted content in the HANA architecture is key to ensuring that HD content can flow seamlessly across a wide range of consumer devices.
Service providers
HANA enables new market opportunities for service providers. By providing a secure content protection zone for HD content, HANA would allow service providers to take advantage of the retail channel sooner while reducing capital expenditures and providing simple and reliable access to AV entertainment for their customers.
Consumer electronics manufacturers
CE manufacturers would be able to deliver new and exciting products and features to their consumers while simultaneously simplifying the user experience. Just as importantly, a product that rolls out today would not become obsolete every time something new is introduced. New products are required to adhere to the baseline standard guaranteeing interoperability with existing products.
Information technology
HANA would enable consumers to move their personal content from the Internet and their PCs to their CE devices around the home. By developing a standards-based secure environment for the distribution of content, HANA sought to help improve the consumer experience, expand the community of network media devices, and create new market opportunities.

== HAVi ==
Eight major consumer electronics manufacturers in 1997 came up with an open standard enabling home entertainment devices to communicate intelligently with each other. The HAVi (Home Audio Video Interoperability) standard promised to bring true platform-independent interoperability to consumer devices using high bandwidth IEEE 1394 (FireWire) as the connecting medium.

The manufactures, namely Grundig, Hitachi, Panasonic, Philips, Sharp, Sony, Thomson and Toshiba along with now over 30 other participants, had formed a non-profit organization called HAVi (Home Audio Video Interoperability) for promoting the development of interoperable consumer products. The goal of HAVi organization is to provide a standard open architecture for intelligent audio and video devices to interoperate with each other regardless of manufacturer, operating system, CPU, or programming language used for implementation (HAVi, Inc., 2001a).

The first beta version of the HAVi standard version 1.0 was published in December 1998, while the final 1.0 version was released in December 1999. The current version of the specification is 1.1 (HAVi, Inc., 2001b), and it was published on May 15, 2001. Only a few HAVi-capable products were ever sold; none of the founders of the consortium pursues the standard anymore.

== Content protection ==
HANA uses content protection developed in conjunction with IBM, a HANA member, called Advanced Secure Content Cluster Technology (ASCCT). ASCCT content protection is based on broadcast encryption key management and AES 128 for distribution and storage. ASCCT was designed specifically for home networks. Devices connected on a HANA network are cryptographically bound to each other to create an “authorized domain”, with each domain receiving its own unique ID. All devices that are members of this domain share certain cryptographic secrets allowing them to act in many ways as if they are a single device. When content is received into the authorized domain, it too is bound in that only authorized members of the domain will have the keys to decrypt it. If a copy were to be given to a non-authorized device, it would not be able to decrypt it, rendering the copy useless. Moreover, devices may only be a member of a single domain, and they may only play content that is bound to that domain. This avoids any situation where a device is loaded with content on one network and then moved to another. To share content, it must join the new network, at which time its keys from the original domain are destroyed and the content rendered unreadable.

ASCCT, as implemented by HANA, is a peer-to-peer solution. There is no central device that maintains the decryption keys or the library of content. Therefore, there is no central failure point as there are for many other solutions, such as a cable STB PVR or a PC. It is based on broadcast encryption, the same basic technology used in 4C and AACS content protection. Similar to AACS, a compromised device or class of devices is repairable by revoking the keys that can occur any time new content is imported into the domain or a connection is made to a content service. Further, content can be pre-encrypted with ASCCT by a provider or delivered using proprietary content protection, which is then can transcripted to ASSCT using the built-in secure encryption engine in HANA devices.

A benefit of this approach is that it supports managed copies of content distributed by DVD, On-Demand services, downloads from the Internet, etc. Perfect copies of a movie can be stored on any or all devices within the domain without fear the copies will be distributed outside the domain. Portable devices can be disconnected and still play the content, yet any copy left behind them cannot be used if they are connected to another device or network. The decryption keys remain with the authorized device.

== Industry alliances ==
HANA worked with several leading organizations to realize its vision of a trusted, easy-to-use home entertainment network that enhanced the consumer HD experience. HANA did not create specifications; instead, it worked with existing standards and developing design guidelines to incorporate best-in-class technologies. HANA worked with organizations such as the 1394 Trade Association and CableLabs.

== See also ==
- IEEE 1394 interface (FireWire)
