= Copyguard =

Videotape copy protection system

Copyguard (originally trademarked as Copy Guard) was the first embedded videotape copy protection scheme, originally developed by Trans-American Video, Inc. (later Video Duplication, Inc.) in 1975. Copyguard-encoded tapes have their video signals altered in such a way that the tape's video signal is capable of normal playback on any videocassette recorder and television set, but when this signal is copied onto another tape, the result is a loss of vertical synchronization and an unwatchable picture that appears to roll.

Copyguard was widely used by home video distributors but was poorly received by most consumers, who found that it affected the playback of legitimately purchased tapes on TV sets sensitive to its encoding scheme. A number of different companies developed similar alternatives, such as MV-Gard and Stop Copy. All these schemes were eventually usurped by Macrovision's Analog Protection System, a more complicated copy protection scheme based on similar principles, in 1985.

== Theory ==
On the analog video signal of Copyguard-encoded tapes, the vertical synchronization pulse of the vertical blanking interval is altered in such a way that the tape's video signal is capable of normal playback on any videocassette recorder and television set. Contemporary VCRs could not effectively handle this signal when re-recording it onto a duplicated tape, however, making the sync pulse compromised beyond the tolerances of most TV sets to receive it properly. The result is a loss of vertical sync and an unwatchable, rolling picture on pirated tapes. The sync pulse is further degraded by generation loss of the analog signal being re-recorded onto tape.

== Background and development ==
Copyguard was originally developed by Trans-American Video, Inc. (TAV), of Hollywood, Los Angeles, in 1975 and introduced to the public in April that year at the 1975 NAB Show. It was a refinement of a process patented by James D. "Jimmie" Songer (1934–2018), a Texas-born engineer then based in Los Angeles who had earlier invented the modern beam-splitter video assist in the 1960s. Copyguard was the first ever embedded videotape copy protection scheme. It was prefigured by other systems in the early 1970s that required the addition of special circuitry to a VCR in order to decode such copy-protected tapes.

Predating the advent of home video formats such as VHS and Betamax, Copyguard was originally developed for 3/4-inch U-matic tapes, as used predominantly by professional broadcasters. Despite U-matic rarely seeing household use during this time, it was still being widely used for film piracy, with Motion Picture Association of America (MPAA) estimating between $30 million and $500 million in losses due to this piracy in 1974 and 1975. TAV developed Copyguard with input from the MPAA and the FBI. It was also compatible with 1/2-inch EIAJ-1 video tape.

TAV originally marketed Copyguard strictly at videotape publishers, with the company offering it as an add-on to TAV's standard videotape duplication service at a rate of US$1 to $2.50 per tape. The company also explored licensing the technology to other videotape duplication houses simultaneously. A month after introducing Copyguard, TAV petitioned the Federal Communications Commission to explore the use of Copyguard on terrestrial television broadcasts. By early 1976, TAV had licensed Copyguard to twelve tape duplication firms internationally.

In March 1976, TAV, who had by this point renamed themselves to Video Duplication, Inc. (VDI), announced the second version of Copyguard (sometimes known as Copyguard II) in response to complaints that first-generation tapes encoded with Copyguard were incapable of normal playback on some television sets. In September 1976, TDI announced a standalone Copyguard device aimed at broadcasters of cable television and pay-per-view channels that injected Copyguard into the broadcast signal of these channels. This device aimed to thwart making off-the-air recordings of films broadcast on these channels.

== Problems ==
Early in its lifespan, Copyguard was criticized by industry figures for being easy to circumvent with rudimentary knowledge of electronics. Per one report, Copyguard could be circumvented "with a dry cell [battery], two transistors, and a little know-how".

Copyguard was notoriously problematic on most TV sets. Even after the second version of Copyguard was introduced in 1976, it was widely reported that legitimately purchased tapes encoded with Copyguard triggered unstable pictures and horizontal tearing on certain TV sets. These sets were said to have "sloppy" vertical sync circuitry that were sensitive to Copyguard's modification of the vertical synchronization pulse. These complaints increased after Copyguard was used to encode some of the first prerecorded tapes of motion pictures on formats VHS and Betamax in the late 1970s. Numerous companies soon after developed so-called video stabilizers, which were simplified time base correctors enclosed in a small chassis which plugged in between the VCR and the TV set. Many VCRs introduced in the early 1980s contained circuitry that circumvented Copyguard entirely, negating the needed for these standalone video stabilizers.

By 1984, according to the journalist John Teets, Copyguard had stopped seeing widespread use in home video. He quipped that, retrospectively, Copyguard was "about as difficult to defeat as a bad latch on a window, from a burglar's point of view".

== Competitors ==
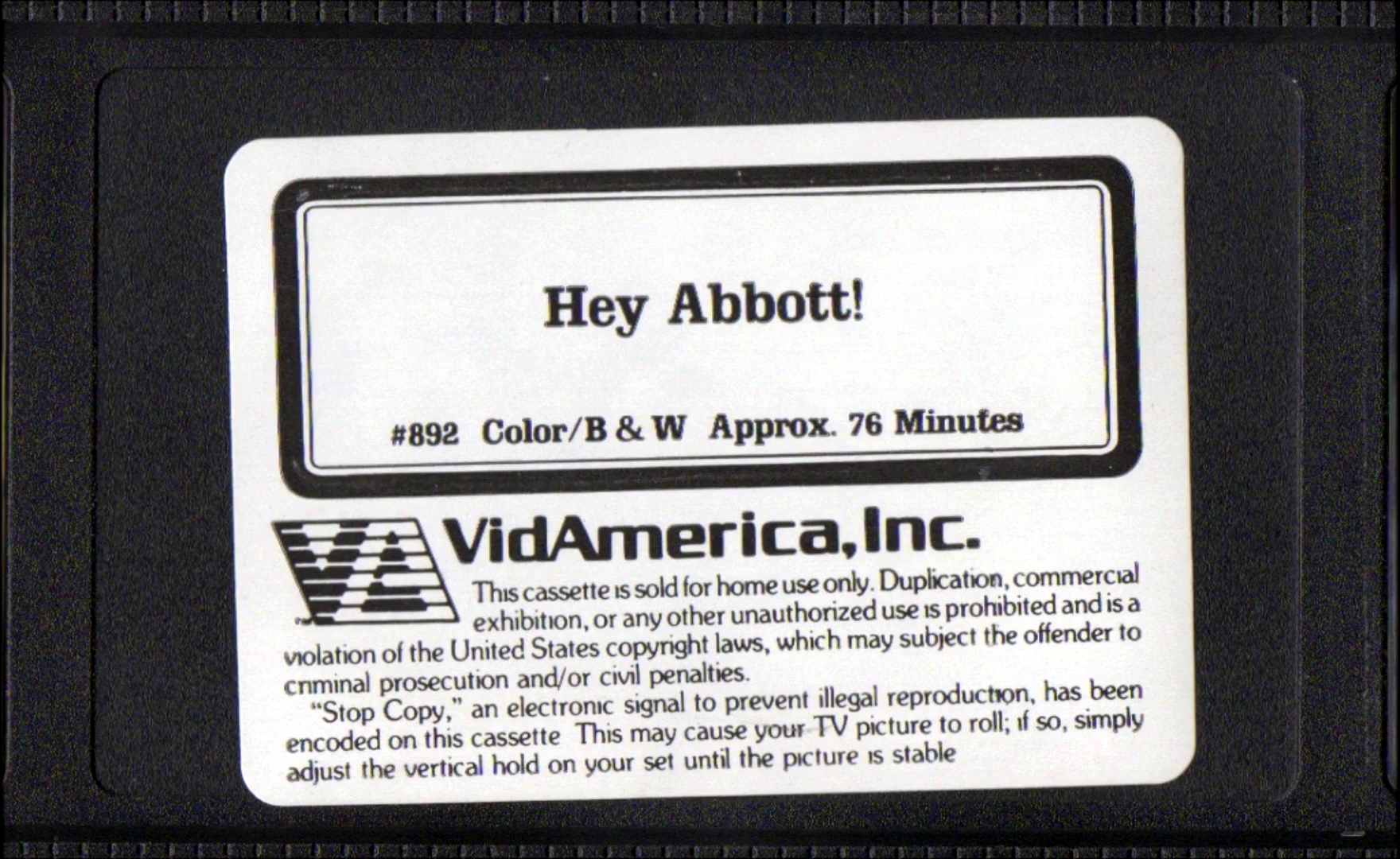
Label of a 1978-issued VHS by VidAmerica, disclosing copy protection by Stop Copy

Within a year of its introduction, Copyguard had a competitor in the form of Stop Copy, developed jointly by Goldmark Communications, Teletronics International, and Byron Motion Pictures, introduced in January 1976. It was licensed to a number of tape duplicators, including VidAmerica.

In 1978, the home video pioneer Magnetic Video Corporation introduced MV-Gard, which worked similarly to Copyguard. In the same year, Video Warehouse of Atlantic Highlands, New Jersey, introduced their own videotape copy protection scheme, Video-Gard.

In 1979, Composite Video of Oklahoma City introduced the Videoguard VG-350 (not to be confused with the Video-Gard detailed above), a standalone device aimed at video duplication houses that modified both the vertical blanking interval and the color burst signal of prerecorded tapes as a form of copy protection. Composite Video claimed that its Videoguard defeated contemporary VCRs improved sync circuits that were able to circumvent Copyguard, without causing rolling pictures.

In 1985, by which point Copyguard and its competitors were nearly extinct, Macrovision introduced its namesake Macrovision copy protection, later known as the Analog Protection System, which was a more complicated copy protection scheme based on principles similar to Copyguard. Macrovision solved most of the problems that plagued Copyguard, and it became the new industry standard for videotape copy protection. By 1986, it was widely adopted by the largest home video distributors at the time, including Buena Vista Home Video, CBS/Fox Video, MCA Home Video, and MGM/UA Home Entertainment.
