= Serial Copy Management System =

Copy protection scheme

The Serial Copy Management System (SCMS) is a copy protection scheme that was created in response to the digital audio tape (DAT) invention, in order to prevent DAT recorders from making second-generation or serial copies. SCMS sets a "copy" bit in all copies, which prevents anyone from making further copies of those first copies. It does not, however, limit the number of first-generation copies made from a master.

SCMS was also included in consumer CD-R, MiniDisc and Digital Compact Cassette (DCC) players and recorders. With the demise of these formats, SCMS is not in widespread use. However, the concept of SCMS was resurrected in the broadcast flag, a measure formerly mandated by the Federal Communications Commission (FCC) to limit the copying of digital TV signals. SCMS flags are also included in the MP3 specifications, though no known decoder or player honors them. Personal Computers were not required to include SCMS in the US.

== History ==
SCMS was created as a compromise between electronics manufacturers, mainly Sony and Philips, who wanted to make DAT machines available in the United States, and the RIAA, which had previously hampered the availability of DAT machines in the US with the threat of lawsuits. The RIAA did not want low-cost digital recorders readily available, since it felt that such technology would result in widespread piracy. These lawsuit threats resulted in a chilling effect, which prevented DAT decks from becoming readily affordable.

In 1987, a member of the RIAA proposed a system where DAT recorders would have copy protection in them. The copy protection would look for the presence of frequencies in a particular high-frequency band; if there was no audio present in this band, the recorder would assume that the music in question was copy protected, and would not allow recording of the music. The record companies would then release all music with this particular frequency band filtered out. It would be illegal to manufacture a DAT machine with the presence of audio in this frequency band; the RIAA was lobbying Congress to make this the law of the land.

The reaction to this proposed scheme was very negative. The Home Recording Rights Coalition orchestrated a letter writing campaign opposing this scheme. Editorials in musician's and home stereo magazines attacked this scheme. The proposed law never made it out of committee.

Even after this law was shot down, the RIAA still threatened to sue anyone who released an affordable consumer DAT recorder in the US. No one made such a recorder available.

In 1992, Congress passed the Audio Home Recording Act. In this law, blank digital media (including DAT tapes and music CD-Rs) would be taxed, with the money going to the RIAA, and a new copy protection scheme, SCMS, would be enforced. Blank analog media, such as cassette tapes, were not subject to the tax. SCMS was compulsory in digital media because there is zero deterioration of quality from copy to copy. SCMS was universally disliked by home musicians who used DAT decks to record their own music; the acronym was pronounced as a derogatory term, "scums".

== Technical details ==
SCMS copy protection looks for bits written in the subcode data in a digital link. There are two bits which are relevant:

- Bit 2 in the Channel Status subchannel is the "Cp" bit indicating whether the source signal is copyrighted or not: 0 means copyrighted, 1 means not copyrighted
- Bit 15 in the Channel Status subchannel is the "L" bit indicating whether the source signal is an original medium (such as an audio CD or a prerecorded DCC tape) or "not determined". For audio CDs and laser optical media, 0 means original and 1 means "not determined"; for other digital sources the values of this bit are reversed.

Copying is only allowed if the source signal for the recording is not copyrighted, or is copyrighted and is an original. If the source signal is a copyrighted recording, the recorder must set the "L" bit to "not determined" when it plays the copy, so that the copy cannot be copied digitally again.

Source Cp	Source L	Copying allowed	Copy L	Copyable Copy
"Copyrighted"	"Original"	Yes	"Not Determined"	No
"Copyrighted"	"Undetermined"	No	N/A	N/A
"Not Copyrighted"	(any)	Yes	(same as source)	Yes

== Circumvention ==
Software and design defects in certain models of consumer Minidisc player allow SCMS to be defeated. Professional-grade Minidisc systems costing several thousand US dollars may have SCMS disabled as standard. Professional CD recorders, including all computer drives, have SCMS disabled and can also record audio onto data CD-R discs.

European electronic hobby magazine Elektor published a construction project in the 1990s. The device, once completed, was designed to be inserted in the digital link between SCMS enabled devices (the article was designed around the optical TOSLINK interface, but it would have been easy to adapt it to the S/PDIF coaxial link). The circuit intercepted the SCMS control bits, and changed the "Cp" bit to the "not copyrighted" state.

Similar functionality is often also included in commercially available bitrate-converters, like the Behringer Ultramatch.

There is another way that SCMS can be defeated, but it requires copying the Table of Contents from a blank disc that already allows copying, to a recorded 'copy disallowed' disc. The method is laborious, and suffers the disadvantage that the track marks and titles are lost in the process.

Minidiscs can be created from computer audio files using a freeware application called Web Minidisc Pro and this indeed offers far greater functionality than Sonicstage. This application features an option to change the SCMS bits in selected tracks to 'unprotected' allowing unlimited copies. The menu option even states an option to remove the SCMS completely, but the operation of this is unclear as the SCMS bits will always be present in the data format.

== See also ==
- Broadcast flag
- Copy Control Information
