= Toby Terrier =

Toy made by Tiger Electronics

Toby Terrier was a toy dog manufactured in the early 1990s by Tiger Electronics. The toy was designed to make various comments and remarks when placed in front of a television playing one of the select PLUS videos from the Toby Terrier and His Video Pals video series. In order for this function to work a specific cartridge that matched up with the video being played would have to be inserted into the toy. His collar contained a sensor that tracked what was going on in the movie. It was activated by pressing a button located below the sensor. The Toby Terrier video series was a comical and educational video series for kids, whose characters consisted of dog puppets. The video series itself was known as Toby Terrier and His Video Pals.

== How It Worked ==
Toby would wag his tail, bark, nod his head and say phrases such as, "Well, scratch my fleas!" as one watched the video when he was turned on. This was accomplished using VEIL Technology. The video fields would send out a data stream that were received through Toby's neck collar. The video also never faded to a pitch black but rather a dark-gray to ensure that Toby would not turn off during a transition. There were also small cartridges that contained different phrases for Toby to say during certain videos (known as "PLUS" videos in the series).

== Video series ==
Toby Terrier and His Video Pals was a video series produced by Sid and Marty Krofft that went along with the electronic toy.

=== Types of Videos ===
- Normal
  - These videos did not need a cartridge and the titles are as follows:
    - Singin' And Dancin' And Waggin' Our Tails!
    - Safety First!
    - Time For A Party!
- Adventures PLUS
  - These videos required the user to insert an included cartridge into Toby's underside. This allowed Toby to make various exclamations while watching the video.
    - Is There A Dog-Tor In The House?
    - Let's Go To The Zoo!
    - Walking On The Sunny Side!
- Toby's Wonder Bone Amazing Interactive Video Learning System
  - These videos required the Wonder Bone in order for Toby to function correctly.
    - And The Winner Is...
    - Where In The World Is Charlie Chihuahua?
    - School Daze

== Images ==
A picture showing two of the Toby Terrier and His Video Pals videos.
