= Digital Transition Content Security Act =

The United States The Digital Transition Content Security Act (DTCSA, H.R. 4569) was a bill introduced by House Judiciary Committee Chairman James Sensenbrenner Jr., a Wisconsin Republican, on December 16, 2005. The bill was backed by Democratic Rep. John Conyers.

Its goal is "[t]o require certain analog conversion devices to preserve digital content security measures", i.e. plugging the analog hole. The bill effectively proposes mandating of the VEIL Rights Assertion Mark technology into new video-handling consumer devices. The bill was referred to subcommittee in 2006 and no further action seems to have been taken since then.

== Advocates ==
MPAA Chairman Dan Glickman applauded the bill, saying it was a "very important piece of legislation that will promote more consumer choice as it protects copyright owners in the digital age."

== Critics ==
Public Knowledge President Gigi Sohn testified before the House Judiciary Committee (United States House Judiciary Subcommittee on Courts, the Internet, and Intellectual Property. Oversight Hearing on "Content Protection in the Digital Age: The Broadcast Flag, High-Definition Radio, and the Analog Hole") on November 3. She stated:

The broad, sweeping draft legislation to close the analog hole suffers from the same problem; it puts the government in the role of making industrial policy, and will severely limit consumers' ability to make lawful uses of copyrighted content. Like the broadcast flag, the legislation mandates a one-size-fits-all technology that has not been the subject of public or even inter-industry scrutiny. The prohibitions in the legislation would require redesign of a whole range of currently legal consumer devices, including DVD recorders, personal video recorders and camcorders with video inputs. Importantly, the existence of the analog hole has been touted as a "safety valve" for making fair use of digital media products where circumventing the technological locks has been rendered illegal by the Digital Millennium Copyright Act. Should Congress close that hole without amending the DMCA to protect fair use, consumers' rights to access digital copyrighted works will be eroded even further.

There are better alternatives for protecting digital content than the heavy-handed technology mandates proposed here today. Those alternatives are a multi-pronged approach of consumer education, enforcement of copyright laws and use of technological tools developed in the marketplace, not mandated by government. The recent Grokster decision and the passage of the Family Entertainment and Copyright Act, which you spearheaded, Mr. Chairman, are just two of several new tools that the content industry has at its disposal to protect its content.

=== Secrecy ===
Ed Felten, a respected computer scientist, has criticized the law for its secrecy. He calls it a "secret law—a requirement that all devices that accept analog video inputs must implement a secret technical specification for something called a VEIL detector. If you want to see this specification, you have to pay a $10,000 fee to a private company and you have to promise not to tell anyone about the technology. It's pretty disturbing that our representatives would propose this kind of secret law."

== See also ==
- Digital Millennium Copyright Act
- Digital Content Protection Act of 2006
- Intellectual property legislation pending in the United States Congress
