= Analog hole =

Inevitable vulnerability in copy protection

The analog hole (also known as the analog loophole or analog gap) is a perceived fundamental and inevitable vulnerability in copy protection schemes for noninteractive works in digital formats which can be exploited to duplicate copy-protected works using analog means. Once digital information is converted to a human-perceptible (analog) form, it is a relatively simple matter to digitally recapture that analog reproduction in an unrestricted form, thereby fundamentally circumventing any and all restrictions placed on copyrighted digitally distributed work. Media publishers who use digital rights management (DRM), to restrict how a work can be used, perceive the necessity to make it visible or audible as a "hole" in the control that DRM otherwise affords them.

== Overview ==
The act of creating a VHS backup of digital media using an analog hole technique, as depicted in the web series On Cinema

Although the technology for creating digital recordings from analog sources has existed for some time, it was not necessarily viewed as a "hole" until the widespread deployment of DRM in the late 1990s. However, if the correct equipment is not used to perform the conversion, the resulting copy may have distinguishable low fidelity (or other deformations) compared to the analog (or digital) original.

Regardless of any digital or software copy control mechanisms, if sound can be captured by a microphone, it can be either recorded by analog means (e.g. magnetic tape), or stored digitally. And if images (static images or video/film), including text, can be seen by a camera, they can also be recorded. In the case of text the image can be converted back to text using optical character recognition (OCR).

In the case of digital images, content creators may try and prevent casual copying by configuring webpages to disable the "Save image" function, but this can easily be defeated by taking a screenshot (or taking a photograph of the screen), even if this results in a loss of quality. Watermarking however, can be an effective measure or only showing the image in a low resolution to make it unusable.

In the case of streaming music services, software exists that can digitally capture the analog output of a personal computer's sound card, and then save in a portable music format with no perceptible loss in quality.

== Response ==
In 2002 and 2003, the U.S. motion picture industry publicly discussed the possibility of legislation to "close the analog hole"—most likely through regulation of digital recording devices, limiting their ability to record analog video signals that appear to be commercial audiovisual works. These proposals are discussed in the Content Protection Status Report, Consumer Broadband and Digital Television Promotion Act, and Analog Reconversion Discussion Group. Inventors of digital watermark technologies were particularly interested in this possibility because of the prospect that recording devices could be required to screen inputs for the presence of a particular watermark (and hence, presumably, their manufacturers would need to pay a patent royalty to the watermark's inventor).

The motion picture industry has also pursued several private-sector approaches to eliminating the analog hole; these might be implemented without additional legislation.

- Analog signals can be degraded in ways that interfere with or confuse some recording devices. For example, Macrovision attempts to defeat recording by VCRs and DVD players by outputting a deliberately distorted signal, crippling the automatic gain control for video, causing the brightness to fluctuate wildly. While this is only supposed to happen to copies, it may, as an inadvertent side-effect, happen when viewing the original video as well. Some vendors claim to have developed equivalent techniques for preventing recording by video capture cards in personal computers. Devices exist, however, to counteract this measure.
- Manufacturers of recording devices can be required to screen analog inputs for watermarks (or Macrovision or DCS Copy Protection or CGMS-A) and limit recording as a condition of private contracts. For example, a manufacturer who licenses patents or trade secrets associated with a particular DRM scheme might also be obliged as a purely contractual matter to add recording limitations to digital recording products.
- Manufacturers of certain playback devices such as set-top boxes can be required, as a condition of private contracts, to allow publishers or broadcasters to disable analog outputs entirely, or to degrade the analog output quality, when particular programming is displayed. This capability is one example of selectable output control. A broadcaster could then prevent all recording of a broadcast program by indicating that compliant receiving devices should refuse to output it through analog outputs at all. On some of the latest playback devices, analog outputs have been eliminated completely.
- The Image Constraint Token is a feature of Blu-ray and HD DVD which can require video output resolution to be decreased when video is output through analog connections.

In theory, it is possible to bypass all these measures by constructing a player that creates a copy of every frame and sound it plays. Although this is not within the capability of most people, many bootleggers simply record the video being displayed with a video camera or use recording and playing devices that are not designed to use the protection measures. In fact, the Motion Picture Association of America has recommended use of a camcorder as an alternative to circumventing the Content Scramble System on DVDs.

== See also ==
- Cam (bootleg)
- Copyright law of Japan
- Digital Transition Content Security Act
- Fair use
- High-bandwidth Digital Content Protection
- Secure cryptoprocessor
- Trusted Computing
- Trusted execution environment
- Trusted Platform Module
