= Authorized domain =

In the DVB Project's Content Protection and Copy Management (CPCM) scheme, an Authorized Domain is a set of CPCM-compliant devices that "are owned, rented or otherwise controlled by members of a single household", according to the DVB Project. Industry observers saw Authorized Domain as having the potential either to loosen or to tighten restrictions on the use of copyrighted works. Detractors felt it might raise the price of content consumption for end-users and damage their ability to duplicate copies of works. Supporters of Authorized Domain, on the other hand, said it is neutral to such concerns, because it doesn't favor one content distribution business model over another.
