= Lytton CNR Thompson Bridge =

Lytton CNR Fraser Bridge
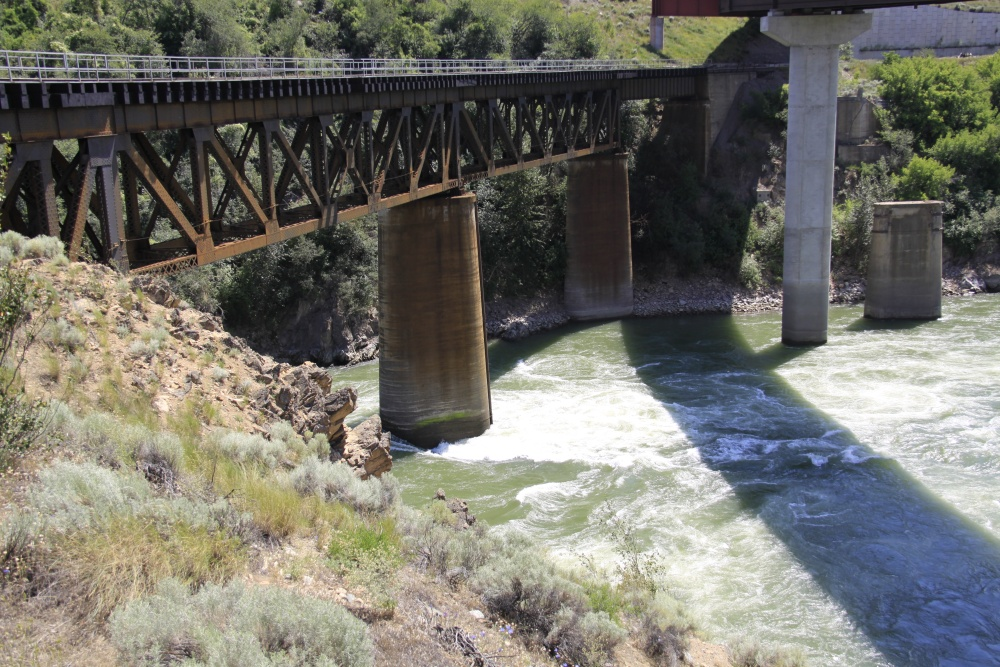
- Coordinates: 50.236756°N 121.580732°W
- Carries: Canadian National Railway
- Crosses: Fraser River
- Locale: Lytton, BC

Characteristics
- Design: Pratt truss
- Total length: 180 meters (590 ft)

The Lytton CNR Thompson Bridge is a deck truss bridge carrying the Canadian National Railway tracks from across the Thompson River at Lytton, British Columbia, approximately 200 meters (660 ft) upstream of where the Thompson River merges into the Fraser River. It is of a similar design and should not be confused with the Lytton CNR Fraser Bridge located approximately 1.4 kilometers (0.87 mi) south. It consists of 3 deck Pratt truss spans which are supported on four concrete piers. The centre two piers are in the river while the outer two are shorter and above the waterline. British Columbia Highway 12 crosses the Thompson River mostly parallel to, and slightly downstream of this bridge. The south end of the road bridge is directly above the south end of the railroad bridge.
