= Lytton CNR Fraser Bridge =

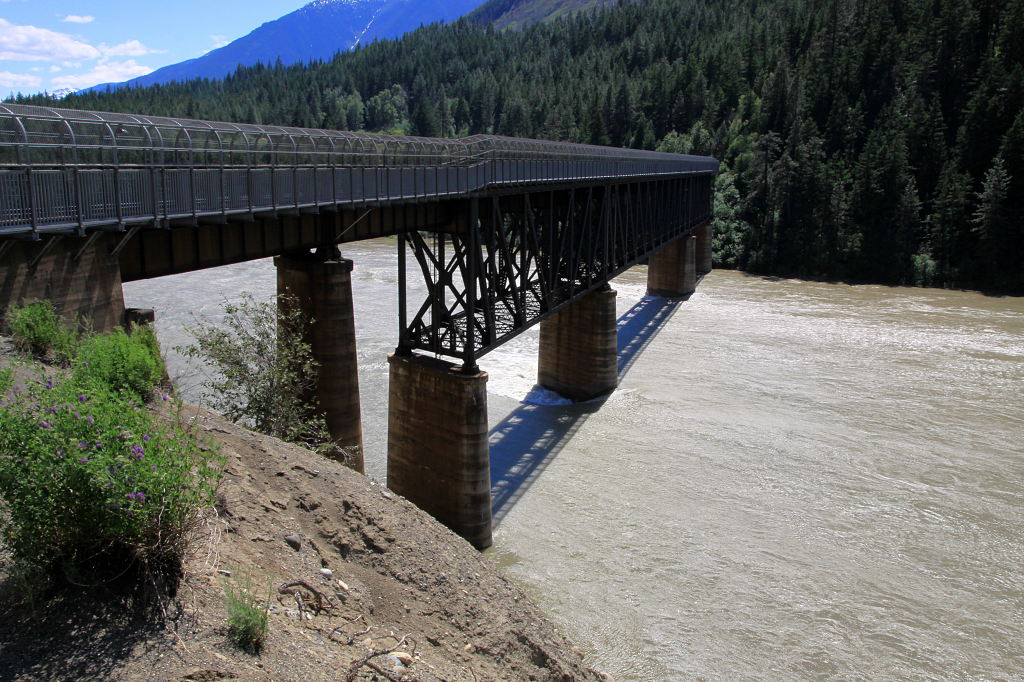
- Coordinates: 50.224227°N 121.585045°W
- Carries: Canadian National Railway
- Crosses: Fraser River
- Locale: Lytton, BC

Characteristics
- Design: Pratt truss
- Total length: 260 meters (850 ft)
- Longest span: 90 meters (300 ft)

The Lytton CNR Fraser Bridge is a deck truss bridge carrying the Canadian National Railway tracks across the Fraser River at Lytton, British Columbia. It is of a similar design to the Lytton CNR Thompson Bridge, located approximately 1.4 kilometers (0.87 mi) north. The bridge consists of three deck Pratt truss spans; the centre span measures approximately 90 metres, and each side span measures approximately 45 metres. The approach at either end is a pair of deck plate girder spans of approximately 20m each. The three centre truss spans are supported on four concrete piers. At each end, the approach girder spans are supported on the abutments, a taller and thinner concrete pier, and the truss spans. The Fraser River's water level varies dramatically throughout the year; the centre piers can be fully surrounded by rushing water in the spring and completely on dry land in late summer and fall. A pedestrian walkway on the north side of the bridge serves Indian reserve communities and other rural residents on the west side of the Fraser River.

== See also ==
- List of crossings of the Fraser River
- List of bridges in Canada
