= Nvidia Titan =

Nvidia Titan is a brand of video cards developed by Nvidia including:

- GTX Titan, released in 2013
- GTX Titan Black, released in February 2014
- GTX Titan Z, released in March 2014
- GTX Titan X, released in March 2015
- Titan X (2016), released in 2016
- Titan Xp, released in April 2017
- Titan V, released in December 2017
- Titan RTX, released in 2018
