= Romanian National Committee =

Several political organisations have been called Romanian National Committee:

- Romanian National Committee (1848), made to coordinate the 1848 revolutions of Romanians in Transylvania
- Romanian National Committee (1918), with the aim of unifying Transylvania with Romania
- Romanian National Committee (1940), organization against the National Legionary State in Romania
- Romanian National Committee (1948), self-proclaimed government in exile of Romania during its communist period
- Romanian National Committee (1975), continuation attempt of the latter, which was disestablished in 1972
