= Cops and Robbers =

Cops and Robbers may refer to:

== Film and television ==
- Cops and Robbers (1951 film), a 1951 Italian film
- Cops and Robbers (1973 film), a 1973 film starring Cliff Gorman and Joseph Bologna
- Cops and Robbers (1979 film), a 1979 Hong Kong film
- Cops and Robbers (1993 film), an Australian film
- Cops and Robbers (2017 film), an American film
- Cops and Robbers (2020 film), an American short animated film
- "Cops & Robbers" (Castle), a 2011 television episode
- "Cops and Robbers" (FBI), a 2018 television episode

== Music ==
- "Cops and Robbers" (song), a 2007 song by The Hoosiers
- "Cops and Robbers", a 1956 song by Kent Harris aka "Boogaloo And His Gallant Crew"
- "Cops and robbers", a 2023 song by Underscores
- "Cops & Robbers", a 2013 mixplay by Hip Hop artist Gunplay
- "Cops And Robbers", a 1986 song by Kahoru Kohiruimaki.

== Games ==
- Cops 'n' Robbers, a 1985 video game by Atlantis for various 8-bit computers
- Pursuit-evasion, a family of problems in mathematics and computer science
- A children's game based on tag
