= Image Constraint Token =

Protocol flag

The Image Constraint Token (ICT) is a protocol flag that can cause downsampling of high-definition video content on Blu-ray and HD DVD to slightly-better-than-DVD quality video. It is part of the Advanced Access Content System, the digital rights management system used in high-definition optical disc formats.

== Operation ==
When using an AACS-enabled player, all components in the display chain (including the display panel) must be considered "secure". This security is enforced through the High-bandwidth Digital Content Protection (HDCP) system, available on some devices which support DVI and HDMI video connections. If any components in the display chain do not support HDCP (such as a display connected to the player through analog connections like component, composite or S-Video) and the ICT flag is enabled, the player automatically reduces the high-definition video to the resolution of 960x540 pixels before outputting it. Hence, while higher resolution than that of a standard DVD, the resulting video signal is no longer truly high-definition.

The Image Constraint Token applies on a per disc basis, so that one movie title could have it enabled while another from a different studio could have it disabled. It impacts video only, and has no effect on audio signal quality. Discs with ICT enabled will (theoretically) have it marked on the outside of package, allowing consumers to see if the specific disc has the flag enabled.

Note that ICT in conjunction with HDCP is used to protect the display path over which the video data travels, not the actual data on the disc itself.

== Rationale ==
The use of ICT is an attempt to prevent individuals from creating unauthorized high-resolution copies of copyrighted content. Without content protection, users with the appropriate equipment could easily capture each and every frame of the film at its full resolution, effectively making a "perfect" copy. Although this danger is greatest for unsecured digital outputs, analog outputs also allow copies to be made (see analog hole), albeit with a potential for slightly reduced quality.

Some early adopters of HDTV object to the ICT flag because initial HDTVs did not incorporate HDCP support and thus, if this was activated, these individuals would not be able to enjoy high-definition video from such discs.

== See also ==
- Macrovision
- Broadcast flag
- Protected Video Path
- Selectable Output Control
