= Analog Protection System =

Copy protection system in VHS and DVDs

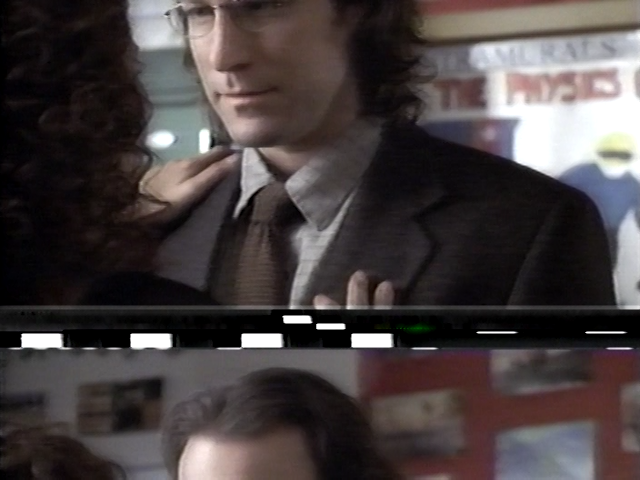
The Analog Protection System consists of several white boxes embedded in the vertical blanking interval, as seen in this still from a commercial VHS release.

The Analog Protection System (APS), also known as Analog Copy Protection (ACP) or Macrovision, is a VHS and DVD copy protection system originally developed by the Macrovision Corporation. Video tapes copied from DVDs encoded with APS become garbled and unwatchable. The process works by adding pulses to analog video signals to negatively impact the AGC circuit of a recording device. In digital devices, changes to the analog video signal are created by a chip that converts the digital video to analog within the device. In DVD players, trigger bits are created during DVD authoring to inform the APS that it should be applied to DVD players' analog outputs or analog video outputs on a PC while playing back a protected DVD-Video disc. In set top boxes trigger bits are incorporated into Conditional Access Entitlement Control Messages (ECM) in the stream delivered to the STB.

In VHS, alterations to the analog video signal are added in a Macrovision-provided "processor box" used by duplicators.

== Principle of operation ==
Analog video formats convey video signals as a series of raster scan lines. Most of these lines are used for constructing the visible image, and are shown on the screen. But several more lines exist which do not convey visual information. Known as the vertical blanking interval (VBI), these extra lines historically served no purpose other than to contain the vertical synchronizing pulses, but in more modern implementations they are used to carry or convey different things in different countries; for example closed captioning.

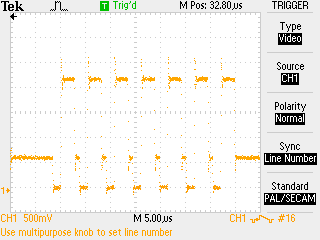
Macrovision pulses in an otherwise unused video line. Here they are large, forcing a VCR's auto contrast circuit to make the picture darker.

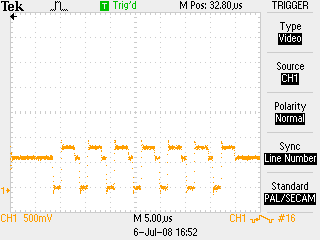
A couple of seconds later, the pulses have reduced in amplitude, forcing a VCR's auto contrast circuit to make the picture lighter. A couple of seconds later still, the pulses return to their original amplitude, darkening the picture once more.

Macrovision's legacy analog copy protection (ACP) works by implanting a series of excessive voltage pulses within the off-screen VBI lines of video. These pulses were included physically within pre-existing recordings on VHS and Betamax and were generated upon playback by a chip in DVD players and digital cable or satellite boxes. A DVD recorder receiving an analog signal featuring these pulses would detect them and display a message saying that the source is "copy-protected" followed by aborting the recording. VCRs, in turn, react to these excessive voltage pulses by compensating with their automatic gain control circuitry. This causes the recorded picture to wildly change brightness, rendering it annoying to watch. The system was only effective on VCRs made in the mid-1980s. In addition, these voltage pulses caused some TVs to lose track of the vertical blanking interval, meaning they no longer knew when one frame ended and the next began. This caused the picture to roll wildly up and down the screen on affected sets.

A later form of Macrovision's analog copy protection, called Level II ACP, introduced multiple 180-degree phase inversions to the analog signal's color burst. Also known as color striping, this technology caused numerous off-color bands to appear within the picture.

APS can be also signaled digitally, in the CGMS-A bit field sent in the vertical blanking interval.

== Problems ==
Historically, the original Macrovision technology was considered a nuisance to some specialist users because it could interfere with other electronic equipment. For example, if one were to run a video signal through a VCR before the television, some VCRs would output a ruined signal regardless of whether it is recording. This also occurs in some TV-VCR combo sets. Apart from this, many DVD recorders mistake the mechanical instability of worn videotapes for Macrovision signals, and so refuse to make what would be perfectly legal DVD dubs of legitimate video tapes, such as home movies. This widespread problem was another factor contributing to the demand for devices that defeat Macrovision. The signal has also been known to confuse home theater line doublers (devices for improving the quality of video for large projection TVs) and some high-end television comb filters. In addition, Macrovision confuses many upconverters (devices that convert a video signal to a higher resolution), causing them to shut down and refuse to play Macrovision content.

== Predecessors and competitors ==
APS was preceded by Copyguard, the very first embedded videotape copy protection process, in 1975. Copyguard was originally developed by Trans-American Video, Inc., and licensed to numerous early tape duplication houses. However, it notoriously problematic, with many legitimately purchased tapes triggering unstable pictures on some TV sets. It fell out of favor by the early 1980s, with APS replacing it as the new de facto standard.

Another form of analog copy protection, known as CGMS-A, is added by DVD players and digital cable/satellite boxes. While not invented by Macrovision, the company's products implemented it. CGMS-A consists of a "flag" within the vertical blanking interval (essentially data, like closed captioning) which digital recording devices search for. If present, it refused to record the signal, just as with the earlier ACP technology. Unlike digital recording equipment, however, analog VCRs do not respond to CGMS-A encoded video and would record it successfully if ACP is not also present.

== Bypassing and defeating ==
There are also devices called stabilizers, video stabilizers or enhancers available that filter out the Macrovision spikes and thereby defeat the system. The principle of their function lies in detecting the vertical synchronization signal, and forcing the lines occurring during the VBI to black level, removing the AGC-confusing pulses. They can be easily built by hobbyists, as nothing more than a cheap microcontroller together with an analog multiplexer and a little other circuitry is needed. Individuals less experienced with such things can purchase video stabilizers.

Discs made with DVD copying programs such as DVD Decrypter and DVD Shrink automatically disable any Macrovision copy protection. The ease with which Macrovision and other copy protection measures can be defeated has prompted a steadily growing number of DVD releases that do not have copy protection of any kind, Content Scramble System (CSS) or Macrovision. Digital recording devices (DVD recorders), on the other hand, often disallow the recording if they detect a protection signal on the input. The unit may display an error message about the program being copy protected.

=== Legality of circumvention ===
United States fair use law, as interpreted in the decision over Betamax (Sony Corp. v. Universal City Studios), dictates that consumers are fully within their legal rights to copy videos they own. However, the legality has changed somewhat with the controversial Digital Millennium Copyright Act. After April 26, 2002, no VCR may be manufactured or imported without Automatic Gain Control circuitry (which renders VCRs vulnerable to Macrovision). This is contained in title 17, section 1201(k) of the Digital Millennium Copyright Act. However, after 2002 there were still some mostly older VCR models on the market that were not affected by Macrovision.

On October 26, 2001, the sale, purchase, or manufacture of any device that has no commercial purpose other than disabling Macrovision copy protection was made illegal under section 1201(a) of the same controversial act.

In June 2005, Macrovision sent a cease and desist letter to "Lightning UK!", the maker of DVD Decrypter, a program that allows users to back up their DVDs by bypassing CSS and Macrovision. Macrovision later acquired the rights to this software.

In June 2005, Macrovision sued Sima Products under section 1201 of the DMCA, claiming that Sima's video processors provided a way to circumvent Macrovision's analog copy protection. Sima received an injunction barring the sale of this device, but the parties ultimately settled without a judgment on the legal issues.
