= Broadcast flag =

Bits in a digital television program that indicates recording restrictions

A broadcast flag is a bit field sent in the data stream of a digital television program that indicates whether or not the data stream can be recorded, or if there are any restrictions on recorded content. Possible restrictions include the inability to save an unencrypted digital program to a hard disk or other non-volatile storage, inability to make secondary copies of recorded content (in order to share or archive), forceful reduction of quality when recording (such as reducing high-definition video to the resolution of standard TVs), and inability to skip over commercials.

In the United States, new television receivers using the ATSC standard were supposed to incorporate this functionality by July 1, 2005. The requirement was successfully contested in 2005 and rescinded in 2011.

== FCC ruling ==
Officially called "Digital Broadcast Television Redistribution Control", the FCC's rule is in 47 CFR 73.9002(b) and the following sections, stating in part: "No party shall sell or distribute in interstate commerce a Covered Demodulator Product that does not comply with the Demodulator Compliance Requirements and Demodulator Robustness Requirements." According to the rule, hardware must "actively thwart" piracy.

The rule's Demodulator Compliance Requirements insists that all HDTV demodulators must "listen" for the flag (or assume it to be present in all signals). Flagged content must be output only to "protected outputs" (such as DVI and HDMI ports with HDCP encryption), or in degraded form through analog outputs or digital outputs with visual resolution of 720x480 pixels (EDTV) or less. Flagged content may be recorded only by "authorized" methods, which may include tethering of recordings to a single device.

Since broadcast flags could be activated at any time, a viewer who often records a program might suddenly find that it is no longer possible to save their favorite show. This and other reasons lead many to see the flags as a direct affront to consumer rights.

The Demodulator Robustness Requirements are difficult to implement in open source systems. Devices must be "robust" against user access or modifications so that someone could not easily alter it to ignore the broadcast flags that permit access to the full digital stream. Since open-source device drivers are by design user-modifiable, a PC TV tuner card with open-source drivers would not be "robust".

The GNU Radio project already successfully demonstrated that purely software-based demodulators can exist and the hardware rule is not fully enforceable.

== Current status ==
In American Library Association v. FCC, 406 F.3d 689 (D.C. Cir. 2005), the United States Court of Appeals for the D.C. Circuit ruled that the FCC had exceeded its authority in creating this rule. The court stated that the Commission could not prohibit the manufacture of computer or video hardware without copy-protection technology because the FCC only has authority to regulate transmissions, not devices that receive communications. While it is always possible that the Supreme Court could overturn this ruling, the more likely reemergence of the broadcast flag is in legislation granting such authority to the FCC.

On May 1, 2006, Sen. Ted Stevens inserted a version of the Broadcast Flag into the Communications, Consumer's Choice, and Broadband Deployment Act of 2006. On June 22, 2006 Sen. John E. Sununu offered an amendment to strike the broadcast and radio flag, but this failed and the broadcast-flag amendment was approved by the Commerce committee. Nonetheless, the overall bill was never passed, and thus died upon adjournment of the 109th Congress in December 2006.

On May 18, 2008, News.com reported that Microsoft had confirmed that current versions of Windows Media Center shipping with the Windows family of operating systems adhered to the use of the broadcast flag, following reports of users being blocked from taping specific airings of NBC programs, mainly American Gladiators and Medium. A Microsoft spokesperson said that Windows Media Center adheres to the "rules set forth by the FCC".

On August 22, 2011, the FCC officially eliminated the broadcast flag regulations.

== Related technologies ==
=== Radio broadcast flag and RIAA ===
With the coming of digital radio, the recording industry is attempting to change the ground rules for copyright of songs played on radio. Currently, over the air (i.e. broadcast but not Internet) radio stations may play songs freely but RIAA wants Congress to insert a radio broadcast flag. On April 26, 2006, Congress held a hearing over the radio broadcast flag. Among the witnesses were musicians Anita Baker and Todd Rundgren.

=== European Broadcast Flag ===
At present no equivalent signal is typically used in European DVB transmissions, although DVB-CPCM would provide such a set of signal as defined by DVB-SI, usable on clear-to-air television broadcasts. How adherence to such a system would be enforced in a receiver is not yet clear.

In the UK, the BBC introduced content protection restrictions in 2010 on Free to Air content by licensing data necessary to receive the service information for the Freeview HD broadcasts. However the BBC have stated the highest protection applied will be to allow only one copy to be made.

=== ISDB ===
ISDB broadcasts are protected as to allow the broadcast to be digitally recorded once, but to not allow digital copies of the recording to be made. Analog recordings can be copied freely. It is possible to disallow the use of analog outputs, although this has yet to be implemented. The protection can be circumvented with the correct hardware and software.

=== DVB-CPCM ===
The Digital Video Broadcasting organization is developing DVB-CPCM which allows broadcasters (especially PayTV broadcaster) far more control over the use of content on (and beyond) home networks. The DVB standards are commonly used in Europe and around the world (for satellite, terrestrial, and cable distribution), but are also employed in the United States by Dish Network. In Europe, some entertainment companies were lobbying to legally mandate the use of DVB-CPCM. Opponents fear that mandating DVB-CPCM will kill independent receiver manufacturers that use open source operating systems (e.g., Linux-based set-top boxes.)

=== Pay-per-view use of broadcast flag ===
In the US, since April 15, 2008, pay-per-view movies on cable and satellite television now are flagged to prevent a recording of a pay-per-view channel to a digital video recorder or other related devices from being retained after 24 hours from the ordered time of the film. This is the standard film industry practice, including for digital rentals from the iTunes Store and Google Play. Movies recorded before that point would still be available without flagging and could be copied freely, though as of 2015 those pre-2008 DVR units are well out-of-date or probably non-functional, and the pay-per-view concern is moot for all but special events, as nearly all satellite providers and cable providers have moved to more easily restricted video on demand platforms; pay-per-view films have been drawn down to non-notable content.

== See also ==
- CGMS-A
- Copy Control Information
- Digital Millennium Copyright Act
- Digital rights management
- Digital Transition Content Security Act
- Family Entertainment and Copyright Act
- Evil bit
- Image Constraint Token
- Selectable Output Control
- Serial Copy Management System
