= Digital Transmission Content Protection =

DRM that restricts digital home technologies

Digital Transmission Content Protection (DTCP) is a digital rights management (DRM) technology that restricts digital home technologies including DVD players and televisions by encrypting interconnections between devices. This permits the distribution of content through other devices such as personal computers or portable media players, if they also implement the DTCP standards. DTCP has also been referred to as "5C" content protection, a reference to the five companies that created DTCP; Hitachi, Intel, Matsushita, Sony, and Toshiba.

The standard was originally proposed in February 1998, when the five companies presented the system to the Copy Protection Technical Working Group (CPTWG), an ad hoc body organized to evaluate DRM technologies. The five companies subsequently established the Digital Transmission Licensing Administrator (DTLA) in June 1998 to simplify licensing procedures and promote acceptance of the DTCP method by content providers, electronics manufacturers, and broadcast service providers. They also released the 5C Digital Transmission Content Protection White Paper describing the system. The paper specifies Hitachi's M6 cipher as the baseline encryption system, which was already in widespread use in the Japanese cable industry.

At the time, FireWire was widely regarded as the up-and-coming standard for interconnecting media devices, although this has not been widely adopted in the decade following. More recently there appears to be a move to using TCP/IP carried on high-speed Ethernet and WiFi connections to replace FireWire and similar systems, a move epitomized by the Apple TV. The DTCP standard has branched out to cover a variety of media types to respond to these industry changes, and now supports USB, IP, WiFi, Bluetooth and MOST (a media standard for automotive platforms) in addition to FireWire.

The DTCP specification is proprietary and is only disseminated to members, who agree to the DTLA agreements (some fees need to be paid to even get the specification). An "informational version" of the specification, omitting some critical details of the implementation, is freely available.

== DTCP+ ==
In November 2010 the Digital Transmission Licensing Administrator proposed enhancements to DTCP known as DTCP+. This enhanced specification was due to be completed in January 2011. DTCP+ adds the following capabilities:

- Digital Only Token
- Media agnostic" way to carry Content Management Information (CMI)
- Copy Count CMI
- Remote Access capability

== See also ==
- CGMS-A
- High-bandwidth Digital Content Protection
- Digital rights management
- Encrypted Media Extensions
- Defective by Design
- Trusted Computing
