= FAIR USE Act =

Proposed United States copyright law

- Long title: Freedom and Innovation Revitalizing U.S. Entrepreneurship Act of 2007
- Acronyms (colloquial): FAIR USE Act

Codification
- Acts amended: Digital Millennium Copyright Act
- U.S.C. sections amended: Section 504(c)(2), Title 17 of the U.S. Code

Legislative history
- Introduced in the House of Representatives as H.R. 1201 by Rick Boucher (D–VA) on February 27, 2007; Committee consideration by Judiciary Committee, Subcommittee on Courts, the Internet, and Intellectual Property on March 19, 2007

The Freedom and Innovation Revitalizing United States Entrepreneurship Act of 2007 (FAIR USE Act) was a proposed United States copyright law that would have amended Title 17 of the U.S. Code, including portions of the Digital Millennium Copyright Act (DMCA) to "promote innovation, to encourage the introduction of new technology, to enhance library preservation efforts, and to protect the fair use rights of consumers, and for other purposes." The bill would prevent courts from holding companies financially liable for copyright infringement stemming from the use of their hardware or software, and proposes six permanent circumvention exemptions to the DMCA.

The bill was introduced on February 27, 2007 in the 110th Congress by Representative Rick Boucher (D-VA). On March 19, 2007, the bill was referred to the House Subcommittee on Courts, the Internet, and Intellectual Property. The bill was not reintroduced.

Boucher emphasized that the bill would not make circumvention an act of fair use, but would instead redefine which acts qualified as permissible circumvention, stating:

"The Digital Millennium Copyright Act dramatically tilted the copyright balance toward complete copyright protection at the expense of the Fair Use rights of the users of copyrighted material. The reintroduced legislation will assure that consumers who purchase digital media can enjoy a broad range of uses of the media for their own convenience in a way which does not infringe the copyright of the work."

== History ==
The FAIR USE Act was Boucher's third attempt at reforming provisions within the DMCA, the previous two being the Digital Media Consumers' Rights Acts (DMCRA) of 2003 and 2005. He had previously co-sponsored the "Benefit Authors without Limiting Advancement or Net Consumer Expectations, or "BALANCE Act," which sought to amend the DMCA to account for noninfringing circumvention.

The Digital Media Consumers' Rights Acts stressed the necessity of adequate labeling on media bearing digital rights management (DRM) and similar protections to prevent consumer confusion. Both amended the DMCA to include exceptions for acts of circumvention that furthered consumers' exercise of fair use rights.

The DMCRA of 2003 included a section of fair use amendments, including amendments to the exemptions described by Section 1201(c) of Title 17. The bill exempted research into "technological measures" from infringement and enabled consumers to circumvent DRM, and qualified that using services for noninfringing uses would not be a violation. The bill also explicitly stated that manufacturing and distributing hardware or software capable of noninfringing uses would likewise not be a violation.

The Motion Picture Association of America (MPAA) and the Recording Industry Association of America (RIAA) criticized both incarnations of the bill, arguing that the language was too permissive and would "legalize hacking and piracy."

== Provisions ==
The FAIR USE Act consists of two main provisions: redefining copyright infringement and amending copyright circumvention exemptions.

=== Section 2: Copyright infringement ===
Section 2 would amend Section 504(c)(2) of Title 17, and would prevent courts from levying statutory damages in cases of secondary infringement.

Section 2 would also amend Section 501 by adding that "no person shall be liable for copyright infringement based on the design, manufacture, or distribution of a hardware device or of a component of the device if the device is capable of substantial, commercially significant noninfringing use." In effect, this would reverse the Supreme Court's decision in MGM Studios, Inc. v. Grokster, Ltd. (2005), which held that "one who distributes a device with the object of promoting its use to infringe copyright ... is liable for the resulting acts of infringement," which has gradually come to be interpreted to mean that any distribution of an object capable of infringement is liable for any resulting infringement. With the Grokster decision null, the prevailing standard regarding secondary liability would return to the Court's decision in Sony v. Universal (also known as the Betamax case).

Section 2 echoes the Court's language in Sony, stating specifically that one may not be held liable for copyright infringement "based on the design, manufacture, or distribution of a hardware device or of a component of the device if the device is capable of substantial, commercially significant noninfringing use."

=== Section 3: DMCA amendments ===
Section 3 first codifies the set of circumvention exemptions granted by the Librarian of Congress as part of the 2006 DMCA rule making process.

Section 3 also amends the DMCA to add exceptions for six types of circumvention. Circumvention by libraries and archives, to skip objectionable content, to transmit over a personal network, to gain access to public domain works, for public interest work and research, and for preservation are added as a new set of exceptions.

==== (I) Libraries and archives ====
Section (I) allows libraries and archives to circumvent copyright for the purposes of compiling audiovisual works that are in a library's collection for educational classroom use by an instructor.

Educational compilations for college film and media courses were exempt by the Librarian of Congress under Section 1201 of the DMCA, but that exemption was set to expire in 2009. Section(I) not only made the exemption permanent, it expanded the exemption to apply to compilations for coursework at all grade levels, in any subject area.

==== (II) Objectionable content ====
Section (II) allows specifically for circumvention via hardware or software that skips objectionable content.

Circumvention for the purposes of avoiding objectionable content became an issue in 2006, when a Denver judge ruled that the edited versions of films sold by companies such as CleanFlicks and CleanFilms were not considered fair use. These companies, along with a handful of others, removed objectionable content (such as nudity and profanity) from DVDs and sold the edited versions to consumers.

In its decision, the court did not address the legality of companies who offered software or hardware that would "read" unaltered media and skip objectionable content. Section (II) allows the sale of hardware, such as modified DVD players sold by CleanPlay, and software, like downloadable plug-ins, that would skip such content.

==== (III) Personal network ====
Section (III) allows circumvention for the purpose of storing or transmitting media over a personal network, but explicitly prevents the uploading of media "to the Internet for mass, indiscriminate redistribution."

==== (IV) Public domain works ====
Section (IV) allows for circumvention that enables access to a public domain work, or a compilation of works that are primarily in the public domain.

Arguably, Section (IV) would expressly allow initiatives such as Google Books, which was originally pioneered in 2004 as a database to increase the availability of, and readers' access to, public domain works.

==== (V) Public interest work and research ====
Section (V) is similar to a broader version of the third prong of fair use. It allows circumvention that is carried out to gain access to a work of substantial public interest solely for the purposes of "criticism, comment, news reporting, scholarship, or research."

The language of Section (V) is ambiguous, which led some critics to worry that the language was too broad, potentially enabling students to circumvent copyright to access books, films, and music for coursework, or allowing professors to create course packs without obtaining permission from publishers.

==== (VI) Circumvention for preservation ====
Section (VI) allows circumvention for purposes of preservation by a library or archives, with respect to works in its collection.

Since the DMCA was passed, librarians across the country protested the limited circumvention rights they were afforded. The Association of Research Libraries addressed the problem of preservation head-on, arguing that "preservation is one of a library's most critical functions... the DMCA is interfering with our ability to preserve these works." The provisions of Section (VII) would effectively eliminate librarians' problems with preservation of works in a library's collection.

== Criticism ==
The FAIR USE Act was subject to criticism of both proponents and opponents of DMCA reform.

Proponents of DMCA reform critiqued the bill for being "wishy-washy". Despite the included amendments, several of which arose in response to public protest, the Act did not allow for circumvention for ripping personal copies for cross-media consumption (i.e. ripping a DVD for use on a video phone or laptop), which some considered the biggest problem with the DMCA.

The bill was also criticized for not maintaining the more strongly worded exemptions enumerated in previous incarnations of DMCA reform legislation, in particular, those regarding the makers and distributors of circumvention technology, which meant that "a film studies professor would be permitted to use software such as Handbrake... However, developing or distributing Handbrake in the United States would still be a crime."

Opponents of the bill focused on problems with the scope and breadth of its language. As with previous Boucher-sponsored bills, the RIAA argued that the bill would "repeal the DMCA and legalize hacking."

== See also ==
- Digital Millennium Copyright Act
- Digital Media Consumers' Rights Act
- INDUCE Act
- Public Domain Enhancement Act
- PRO-IP Act
