= PDEA =

PDEA may refer to:

- Public Domain Enhancement Act, a bill in the United States Congress.
- Philippine Drug Enforcement Agency, law enforcement agency of the Philippines tasked with combating the trade of illegal drugs in the country.
