= Livid =

Livid may refer to:

- Livid (color), dark bluish-grey color

== Music ==
- Livid (festival), an Australian alternative rock music festival
- Livid (rapper), Danish rapper member of Danish rap band Kaliber
- Livid (Blondie album), 2000
- Livid (Nightmare album), 2004

== Others ==
- LiViD, former mailing list about video playback on Linux
- Livid (film), a 2011 French film
