= Digital Media Consumers' Rights Act =

Mandate proper labeling to ensure protection from deceptive labeling practices

The Digital Media Consumers' Rights Act (DMCRA) was a proposed law in the United States that directly challenges portions of the Digital Millennium Copyright Act, and would intensify Federal Trade Commission efforts to mandate proper labeling for copy-protected CDs to ensure consumer protection from deceptive labeling practices. It would also allow manufacturers to innovate in hardware designs and allow consumers to treat CDs as they have historically been able to treat them.

The DMCRA bill was introduced to the United States House of Representatives on January 7, 2003 as H.R. 107 by Rick Boucher. The bill was co-sponsored by John Doolittle, Spencer Bachus and Patrick J. Kennedy.

The bill was reintroduced into Congress once again on March 9, 2005 as H.R. 1201, the 'Digital Media Consumers Rights Act of 2005'. The 2005 bill's original co-sponsors were John Doolittle, and Joe Barton.

  1. Some provisions of the bill were incorporated into the FAIR USE Act of 2007.

== Official summary of the bill ==
The authors of the bill have summarized it as follows:

The Digital Media Consumers’ Rights Act (DMCRA) restores the historical balance in copyright law and ensures the proper labeling of "copy-protected compact discs".

1) Restores the Historic Balance in U.S. Copyright Law

Reaffirms Fair Use. The DMCRA provides that it is not a violation of Section 1201 of Title 17 (the Digital Millennium Copyright Act, or DMCA) to circumvent a technological measure in connection with gaining access to or using a work if the circumvention does not result in an infringement of the copyright in the work. For example, under the bill a user may circumvent an access control on an electronic book he purchased for the purpose of reading it on a different electronic reader. However, if he were to upload the book onto the Internet for distribution to others, he would be liable for both a Section 1201 circumvention violation and for copyright infringement.

Reestablishes Betamax Standard. The DMCRA also would specify that it is not a violation of Section 1201 of the DMCA to manufacture, distribute, or make non-infringing use of a hardware or software product capable of enabling significant non-infringing use of a copyrighted work. By re-establishing the principle set forth in Sony v. Universal City Studios, 464 U.S. 417 (1984), this provision is intended to ensure that consumers will have access to hardware and software products by which to engage in the activities authorized by the legislation. For example, a blind person could develop a means to listen in audio form to an electronic book which had been purchased in text form.

Restores Valid Scientific Research. The bill amends the DMCA to permit researchers to produce the software tools necessary to carry out "scientific research into technological protection measures." Current law allows circumvention for encryption research under specified circumstances. The bill will enable circumvention for research on technological measures other than encryption. The bill also permits a researcher to develop the tools necessary for such circumvention.

2) Ensures Proper Labeling of "Copy-Protected Compact Discs"

Major record companies have begun adding technology to CDs that would block people from making copies. In many cases the technology has also prevented playback on computers, DVD players, or even some standard CD players. It has become apparent that even the limited introduction of these discs into the United States market has caused consumer and increased burdens on retailers and manufacturers. Consumers are accustomed to the functionality of industry standard Compact Discs and should be aware of any reduced playability or recording functionality of non-standard "copy-protected compact discs" before they make the decision to purchase such items. For that reason, the bill directs the Federal Trade Commission to ensure that adequate labeling occurs for the benefit of consumers.

== See also ==
- BALANCE Act
- Digital Millennium Copyright Act
- FAIR USE Act
- Intellectual property legislation pending in the United States Congress
