= LiViD =

LiViD, short for Linux Video and DVD, was a collection of projects that aim to create program tools and software libraries related to DVD for Linux operating system.

The projects included:

- OMS
- GATOS
- mpeg2dec
- ac3dec

In 2002, LiViD project leader Matthew Pavlovich was sued by the DVD Copy Control Association Inc. (DVD CCA) for trade secret misappropriation because they posted DeCSS on the LiViD website.

== See also ==
- DeCSS
- AACS encryption key controversy
