= Stevens v Kabushiki Kaisha Sony Computer Entertainment =

High Court of Australia case concerning copyright

- Court: High Court of Australia
- Decided: 6 October 2005
- Citations: [2005] HCA 58, (2005) 224 CLR 193; 221 ALR 448; 79 ALJR 1850; 65 IPR 513

Case history
- Prior actions: Kabushiki Kaisha Sony Computer Entertainment v Stevens [2003] FCAFC 157 (French, Lindgren and Finkelstein JJ); Kabushiki Kaisha Sony Computer Entertainment v Stevens [2002] FCA 906 (Sackville J)

Court membership
- Judges sitting: Gleeson CJ, McHugh, Gummow, Kirby, Hayne & Heydon JJ

Stevens v Kabushiki Kaisha Sony Computer Entertainment, was a decision of the High Court of Australia concerning the "anti-circumvention" provisions of the Copyright Act 1968. The appellant, Stevens, had sold and installed modchips that circumvented the Sony PlayStation's copy protection mechanism. Sony argued that Stevens had knowingly sold or distributed a "circumvention device" which was capable of circumventing a "technological protection measure", contrary to s 116A of the Copyright Act.

At first instance, the Federal Court (Sackville J) held that the relevant copy protection feature was not a "technological protection measure" and refused Sony's application for relief under s 116A. Sony successfully appealed the primary judge's decision in the Full Court of the Federal Court. The High Court then reversed the Full Court's decision, endorsing Sackville J's construction of the term "technological protection measure".

== Background ==
The Applicant (Collectively described as "Sony") manufacture and distribute the Sony PlayStation computer game console and computer games on CD-ROMs for use with the Sony PlayStation console. Sony owns copyright of the computer programs embodied in the CD-ROMs of the games (as literary works under Part III of the Copyright Act 1968) and in the cinematograph films (as subject-matter other than works in Part IV of the Copyright Act 1968). In the manufacturing process, Sony embedded access control technology in the form of RAC's into all Sony's games. This worked in the way that once a Sony PlayStation game was inserted into a Sony PlayStation console, the console would only play Sony games with the corresponding regional code. If the ROM chip in the game console did not read a RAC or the RAC did not correspond with the console, then it would not play the disk.

This worked to block out illegally copied games, as when a game was conventionally copied to another CD ('burnt') it would not copy the RAC. However, the RAC also blocked legally copied disks and games legally purchased from different regional codes.

As a result of this, a market evolved for modifications ('mod chips'), which could override the RAC scan process in the game console, so that 'burnt' games could be used. Mr Stevens sold and installed 'mod chips' for use in PlayStation consoles, which overrode Sony's access control technology. Stevens carried out this activity in Sydney. In addition to this, Stevens, on two occasions sold unauthorised copies of Sony PlayStation games.

== Federal Court and Appeals ==
In 2001, Sony commenced action in the Federal Court of Australia against Stevens, alleging inter alia that he breached s 116A of the Copyright Act 1968. The allegation was that the unlawful sale of devices (the 'mod chips') circumvented Technological Protection Measures (TPMs). Sony alleged that Steven's 'mod chips' circumvented a measure that protected the applicants' copyright in literary works (computer programs) and cinematograph films. Whether the 'mod chips' were a circumvention device depended on whether Sony's RAC system was defined as a TPM within the meaning of s 10(1) of the Act. This was of particular interest to The Australian Competition & Consumer Commission (ACCC), who successfully applied for amicus curiae because of it. The ACCC thought that Sony's RAC process interfered with imported lawfully sold copyright material in Australia by blocking the use of games purchased from different regional codes.

At first instance in the Federal Court of Australia, Sackville J held that Sony's RAC system did not fall within the meaning of a TPM as contained in s 10(1) of the Act. Sackville J focused his attention on the opening words of the definition, and held that Sony's "device" was not, as such, in the ordinary course of its operation, designed "to prevent or inhibit the infringement of copyright". Sackville J reasoned that Sony's RAC system "merely [had] a general deterrent or discouraging effect on those who might be contemplating infringing copyright... for example, by making unlawful copies of a CD-ROM". Thus, Sackville J held that by not preventing the act of primary infringement in an immediate sense, Sony's RAC system did not constitute a TPM within the meaning of s 10 (1) of the Act.

Sony appealed to the Full Court of the Federal Court of Australia, who reversed the decision of Sackville J. The Full Court reached their decision, on 30 July 2003, through a broader interpretation of the meaning of TPM. The Full Court held that Sonys' RAC system did constitute a TPM, and thus the Respondent was liable for charges based on s 115 of the Act. The Full Court made a declaration as follows:

“ On 8 April 2001, 28 September 2001 and 16 November 2001 [Mr Stevens] sold circumvention devices, as defined in [ the Act, s 10(1)], for use in association with 'PlayStation' computer consoles and the CD-ROMs for ‘ PlayStation' computer games, in contravention of s 116A of [the[ Act".

Stevens appealed to the High Court of Australia. Sony in response, sought to appeal matters on which it did not succeed in the Full Court. The High Court of Australia reversed the decision of the Full Court agreeing with the decision of the primary judge, Sackville. On 6 October 2005, the High Court ruled that Sony PlayStations RAC system could not be defined as a TPM as it did not prevent illegal copying of the games, it merely prevented illegal copies from being played. Thus, Stevens was not liable for this charge.

== High Court decision ==
The key question in the case was whether Sony's device could be defined as a "technological protection measure" (TPM). Sony submitted that its device (comprising either or both the PlayStation Boot ROM and access code) constituted a TPM on three distinct bases, all of which come within the construction of the language in the Copyright Act.

== Construction of definition of 'technological protection measure' ==
A 'technological protection measure' is defined in s10 of the Act as a device that "in the normal course of its operation, prevents, inhibits or restricts the doing of an act comprised in the copyright". Sony's first submission was based on the scope of the definition of "inhibit" in determining whether Sony's protective devices constituted a TPM and were thus protected by s 116A of the Act.

Stevens argued that Sackville J's narrow interpretation of the term "inhibit" at the first hearing was correct. Sackville J defined a device as "designed…to prevent or inhibit" copyright infringement if "but for the operation of the device or product, there would be no technological or perhaps mechanical barrier to a person… putting himself or herself in a position to infringe copyright in the work".

In response, Sony contended that the Full Court of the Federal Court of Australia's interpretation of the term "inhibit", should be accepted. In this broader definition, a device that is designed to "deter" or "discourage" the infringement of copyright was seen as inhibiting the infringement of copyright. The Full Court found that Sony's PlayStation Boot ROM chip and access code "inhibits" infringement of copyright as the restricted access to the work eliminates the reason for users to infringe copyright in the work. Sony pointed out that "an unplayable copy of a PlayStation game has no market value".

The High Court of Australia found that "Sony’s device of the Boot ROM chip and the access code… does not constitute a "technological protection measure" by virtue of the device's deterrent effect on the copying of computer games. That is because the console's inability to load the software from an infringing copy does not make it impossible or more physically difficult to make an infringing copy". The High Court further found that protective devices like the PlayStation Boot ROM and access code are not "designed… to prevent… the infringement of copyright", as they do not render the user unable to "reproduce the work in material form".

== The reproduction in RAM contention ==
Sony's second submission in the High Court was that the device fell within the terms of the definition of "technological protection measure" because it prevented PlayStation users from reproducing copyrighted game code "in material form" in the Ram of the PlayStation console. "Material form" was defined, in section 10 (1) the Act, as including "any form (whether visible or not) of storage from which… a substantial part of the work can be reproduced". In cross-examination, Mr Nabarro from Sony conceded that the game code could not be reproduced "without developing particular hardware to extract [the code] back from RAM".

Sony argued that the dissenting judgment of Finkelstein J in the Full Court of the Federal Court correctly applied the law. His Honour ruled that it is not necessary that "the ability to reproduce the work from storage must exist at the time the work is placed into storage". It is just important that the work "can be reproduced". The High Court declined Sony's argument, siding with Stevens- who relied on the precedent of Emmet J's decision in Australian Video Retailers Association v Warner Home Video Pty Ltd. In which Emmet J ruled, in relation to the RAM of a DVD Player, that: “… In ordinary form, temporary storage of a substantial part of the computer program in the RAM of a DVD Player will not involve a reproduction of the computer program in a material form".

The High Court found, in a majority decision written by Chief Justice Gleeson, that

“ as it is impossible to reproduce the storage of the game code from the RAM of the PlayStation console unless the console is modified with additional, reverse-engineered hardware, it is not possible for the code to be reproduced until that modification occurs. Thus, the definition of "material form" is not satisfied until the conditions that enable the reproduction of the work from storage in RAM prevail".

Stevens produced, supplied and installed mod chips for PlayStations that did not have hardware to extract the code from the RAM. Therefore, the High Court of Australia found that the devices that Steven's mod chips circumvented were not a "technological protection measure" to which s 116A of the Act applied, as they were not "designed… to prevent" the act of reproduction of the work in "material form".

All Judges in both the Full Court of the Federal Court and the High Court of Australia, with the exception of Finkelstein J (Full Court), unanimously agreed with the ruling of Sackville J in declining Sony's "Reproduction in RAM" argument.

== The Cinematographic Film Contention ==
Thirdly, Sony alleged that their device prevented PlayStation users from infringing copyright, by not allowing the RAM in the PlayStation to download a "substantial part" of the game's "cinematograph film". Sony claimed that Steven's mod chips reversed this function, allowing the RAM to download a "substantial part" of the game's "cinematograph film" and thus infringed copyright within the meaning of ss 86(a) and 14(1) of the Copyright Act 1968.

Sackville J in the initial hearing found that only a very small proportion of the images and sounds comprising the cinematograph film were "embodied" in the PlayStation console's RAM at any given time. "In the circumstances as they arose at trial, Sony failed to lay the necessary evidentiary basis for a finding in its favour on substantiality". The High Court accepted this.

The High Court found that although Mr. Nabarro's evidence established that "specific parts of that game console" are transmitted to, and embodied in, the GPU at no point did the "specific parts" form an "aggregate of the visual image". The majority of the High Court held “ At no point in the process through which the game code is downloaded into the RAM and eventually transmitted to the television is a "cinematograph film" copied into any of the PlayStation console's articles or things".

All Judges in both the Full Court of the Federal Court and the High Court of Australia, with the exception of Finkelstein J (Full Court), unanimously agreed with the ruling of Sackville J in declining Sony's "Cinematographic Film" argument.

== Academic Opinion- Conclusions to be drawn from Steven’s Case. ==
In academic circles this case is generally seen as an example of the court taking different approaches to statutory interpretation, in relation to a complex Act.

Chief Justice Gleeson in The High Court stated;

"Over a long period amendments to copyright law have comprised legislative solutions to problems created by competing economic and social pressures associated with the development of new technologies. The issues in the present appeal indicate that this is very much the case today.… The task of the Court on this appeal is to construe the particular compromises reflected in the terms of the Amendment Act".

Gleeson CJ's statement makes sense of the considerable controversy felt in Australia and elsewhere concerning the proper scope of such legislation. Padgett asserts that the overtly complex nature of the Amendments to the Copyright Act, particularly in relation to the copyright infringement exceptions, has made it very difficult to comply with. Padgett believes that this case indicates that the sui generis nature of computer programs needs to be given further consideration and that possibly an independent legal regime needs to be created for computer programs, disassociated from literary works. Despite claims that the Digital Agenda Act will "replicate the balance that has been struck in the print environment between the rights of owners of copyright and the rights of users", this case actually highlights the very fragile nature of copyright in the digital arena.

Dellit & Kendall imply that possibly a 'state of panic' over computer games piracy lead to the increased restrictions of the Digital Agenda Act. This is not surprising with estimations, like Sony's, that Sony games piracy costs the Australian industry $30 million a year. However, as highlighted in Steven's case, the Digital Agenda Act has not yet been able to establish in copyright law the delicate balance between the rights of copyright owners and the interests of copyright users. This delicate balance is reflected in Gleeson CJ's statement referred to above, that “…The task of this Court … is to construe the particular compromises …”

Kenyon & Wright suggest that the effect of this case may spread out to decisions regarding media regulation. The major issue in Australia of the treatment of TPMs and their circumvention under copyright law could possibly re-emerge in decisions about media regulation – as illustrated in the proposal for content protection.
