= Public Domain Enhancement Act =

The Public Domain Enhancement Act (PDEA) (H.R. 2601 (108th Congress), H.R. 2408 (109th Congress)) was a bill in the United States Congress, first introduced in the United States House of Representatives on June 25, 2003, which, if passed, would have added a tax for copyrighted works to retain their copyright status. The purpose of the bill was to make it easier to determine who holds a copyright (by determining the identity of the person who paid the tax), and to allow copyrighted works which have been abandoned by their owners, also known as orphan works, to pass into the public domain.

== Impact ==
In the bill's latest form, the tax would have been a multiple-time affair, a sum of US$1 per work charged 50 years after the date of first publication or on December 31, 2006, whichever occurs later, and every 10 years thereafter until the end of the copyright term, only on works first published within the United States (as charging it from foreigners would violate the Berne convention except in some interpretations of the Berne three-step test). Failure to pay the Copyright Office the copyright renewal fee on or before the date the fee is due or within a grace period of 6 months thereafter would allow the work to irreversibly lapse into the public domain in the United States and other countries and areas applying the rule of the shorter term of the Berne Convention. However, if payments are made in time, the copyright may be extended to the end of the normal maximum term, currently 95 years for a work made for hire. In practice, this would resemble copyright renewal under the Copyright Act of 1909, but the bill will create a 50-year term renewable five times for 45 years.

The problem that the law attempts to solve is that the cost of locating the owner of a work is often prohibitive. For works that are still in print, this is usually not a problem, but otherwise there is typically not a clear record of whether the original creator transferred the rights, died, or had a clear successor to its rights. The PDEA solves this problem by requiring a small tax to maintain copyright on a work. For works that the copyright owner no longer cares about, the copyright will lapse, and so copies and derivatives can be made freely. The Act would also require the Copyright Office to maintain an easily searchable database, so that for works that the original publisher still wishes to maintain copyright on, potential derivative creators can find out who paid the US$1 tax and negotiate with them for permission.

== Legislative history ==
This bill was first introduced in the House on June 25, 2003, by representatives Zoe Lofgren (D-CA) and John T. Doolittle (R-CA) where it went to the House Committee on the Judiciary. On September 4, 2003, it moved to the House Subcommittee on Courts, the Internet, and Intellectual Property. On May 17, 2005, it was reintroduced by Lofgren as H.R. 2408, and was once again referred to the House Judiciary Committee.

== Opposition to PDEA ==
Opposition to the Public Domain Enhancement Act comes from the entertainment industry sphere, particularly the Motion Picture Association of America (MPAA) and its lobbyists. In his book Free Culture, Lawrence Lessig lays out the reason for the MPAA opposition to the bill:

1. Congress had already "firmly rejected" the concept of copyright renewal in the Copyright Act of 1976, which eliminated the need for registration and renewal of copyrighted works.
2. The $1 fee would harm copyright owners, particularly those with large numbers of active and potentially commercially viable works.
3. The extension fee would encourage copyright restoration, a process that re-asserts copyright over a public domain work that originated outside the US and for which US copyright was not renewed.
4. The benefits would fail to justify the administrative costs needed to set up and fund a registration system.
5. The MPAA expressed concern about the effects of a story that underlies a currently copyrighted film moving into the public domain (although this would not invalidate the copyright of the film).
6. The MPAA argues that current law already allows for the creation of derivative works via licensing and release of rights.

Proponents such as Lessig have suggested that copyright holders may be motivated to oppose the PDEA by a competitive threat: a huge wave of abandoned works would spill into the public domain which could form the basis of new derived works that would compete commercially with established copyrighted works.

== See also ==
- List of intellectual property legislation pending in the United States Congress
- BALANCE Act
- FAIR USE Act
- Eldred v. Ashcroft
- Free Culture
- United States copyright law
