= ElcomSoft =

Russian software company

ElcomSoft Co.Ltd.
- Type: Private
- Industry: Software
- Genre: Password Cracking, Operating System Audit
- Founded: 1990
- Headquarters: Moscow, Russia
- Website: www.elcomsoft.com

ElcomSoft is a privately owned software company headquartered in Moscow, Russia. Since its establishment in 1990, the company has been working on computer security programs, with the main focus on password and system recovery software.

== History ==
On July 16, 2001, Dmitry Sklyarov, a Russian citizen employed by ElcomSoft who was at the time visiting the United States for DEF CON, was arrested and charged for violating the United States DMCA law by writing ElcomSoft's Advanced eBook Processor software. He was later released on bail and allowed to return to Russia, and the charges against him were dropped. The charges against ElcomSoft were not, and a court case ensued, attracting much public attention and protest. On December 17, 2002, ElcomSoft was found not guilty of all four charges under the DMCA.

Thunder Tables is the company's own technology developed to ensure guaranteed recovery of Microsoft Word and Microsoft Excel documents protected with 40-bit encryption. The technology first appeared in 2007 and employs the time–memory tradeoff method to build pre-computed hash tables, which open the corresponding files in a matter of seconds instead of days. These tables take around four gigabytes. So far, the technology is used in two password recovery programs: Advanced Office Password Breaker and Advanced PDF Password Recovery.

In 2009 ElcomSoft released a tool that takes WPA/WPA2 Hash Codes and uses brute-force methods to guess the password associated with a wireless network.

On November 30, 2010, Elcomsoft announced that the encryption system used by Canon cameras to ensure that pictures and Exif metadata have not been altered was flawed and cannot be fixed. On that same day, Dmitry Sklyarov gave a presentation at the Confidence 2.0 conference in Prague demonstrating the flaws. Among others, he showed an image of an astronaut planting a flag of the Soviet Union on the moon; all the images pass Canon's authenticity verification.

In 2014 an attacker used the Elcomsoft Phone Password Breaker to determine celebrity Jennifer Lawrence's password and obtain nude photos. Wired said about Apple's cloud services, "...cloud services might be about as secure as leaving your front door key under the mat."
