= The Unlocking Technology Act of 2013 =

Unlocking Technology Act
- Long title: To amend section 1201 of title 17, United States Code, to require the infringement of a copyright for a violation of such section, and for other purposes
- Enacted by: the 113th United States Congress

Codification
- U.S.C. sections amended: 17 U.S.C. § 1201

Legislative history
- Introduced in the House as H.R. 1892 by Zoe Lofgren (D-CA) on May 9, 2013

The Unlocking Technology Act of 2013 is a United States proposed bi-partisan bill that aims to allow circumvention of digital rights management as long as there is no intention of copyright infringement. The bill would legalize actions such as cell phone unlocking and creating versions of copyrighted works specifically designed to be accessible to blind (visually impaired) users. Section 2 of the bill would also require the Assistant Secretary for Communications and Information of the Department of Commerce to issue a report on the impact of 17 U.S.C. 1201 on consumer choice, competition, and free flow of information. The bipartisan bill introduced by Zoe Lofgren(D-CA) had three cosponsors: Thomas Massie (R-KY), Anna Eshoo (D-CA) and Jared Polis (D-CO).

On 8 May 2013, the bill was assigned to two committees House Judiciary and House Ways and Means. As of December 18, 2013, House Ways and Means had taken no action on the bill. House Judiciary reassigned the bill to the Courts, Intellectual Property, and the Internet subcommittee which has taken no action on the bill. Since being introduced the bill garnered four more co-sponsors: Peter DeFazio (D-OR4) (joined May 16, 2013), Rush Holt (D-NJ12) (joined May 16, 2013), Steve Israel (D-NY3) (joined Jul 08, 2013), and Sam Farr (D-CA20) (joined Jul 30, 2013).

Numerous organizations have endorsed the bill, including Public Knowledge, Generation Opportunity, R Street, Cascade Policy Institute, Harbour League, and Let Freedom Ring.

On March 24, 2015, the bill was reintroduced as H.R. 1587.
