= Pavlovich v. Superior Court =

California Supreme Court case

Matthew Pavlovich v. Superior Court
- Supreme Court of California

Decided November 25, 2002
- Full case name: Matthew Pavlovich v. The Superior Court of Santa Clara County
- Citation(s): 29 Cal. 4th 262; 58 P.3d 2; 127 Cal. Rptr. 2d 329

Case history
- Prior history: Pavlovich v. Superior Court, 91 Cal. App. 4th 409

Holding
- The case should be dismissed for lack of personal jurisdiction because the defendant's posting to a passive website, that had a foreseeable tortious effect in California, was not enough to show purposeful availment.

Court membership
- Chief Justice: Ronald M. George
- Associate Justices: Janice Rogers Brown, Joyce L. Kennard, Kathryn Werdegar, Carlos R. Moreno, Marvin R. Baxter, Ming Chin

Case opinions
- Concurrence: (no written opinion) Kennard, Werdegar, Moreno
- Dissent: Baxter, joined by George, Chin

Pavlovich v. Superior Court, 29 Cal. 4th 262, is a California Supreme Court case in which the court declined to find personal jurisdiction over a non-resident defendant who had no personal contacts with California. The Court found that the posting of a misappropriated trade secret on a Web site which could result in harm to California residents was not sufficient to show he had purposely availed himself of the forum state by expressly aiming his conduct at residents of California.

== Background ==
=== Respondent ===
Although The Superior Court of Santa Clara County is the named respondent in the case, the real party in interest is the DVD Copy Control Association ("DVD CCA"), a nonprofit trade association. DVD CCA is a Delaware corporation, with its principal place of business in California. DVD CCA owned the licensing rights to the Content Scrambling System (CSS) which is used to encrypt and protect copyright material on DVDs.

=== Petitioner ===
Matthew Pavlovich was a computer engineering student at Purdue University in Indiana. While a student, he operated a Web site "livid.on.openprojects.net." ("LiVid"). LiVid was founded to promote the development of video and DVD support for the Linux open source operating system. At the time of the California Supreme Court's decision, he lived and worked in Texas.

=== Cause of action ===
Pavlovich posted the source code of a program called DeCSS on the LiVid Web site in October 1999. DeCSS allowed users to decrypt DVDs encrypted with CSS. In December 1999, DVD CCA filed suit against Pavlovich and other defendants in Santa Clara County Superior Court. In its complaint, DVD CCA alleged that Pavlovich misappropriated its trade secrets by posting the DeCSS program on the LiVid Web site. The complaint sought injunctive relief only.

== Procedural history ==
Pavlovich filed a motion to quash service of process, asserting that the court did not have personal jurisdiction over him. The trial court denied the motion and Pavlovich petitioned the Court of Appeal for a writ of mandate directing the court to grant the motion. The Court of Appeal denied the petition without issuing a published opinion, the California Supreme Court granted review and transferred the matter back to the Court of Appeal with directions to vacate its denial order and issue an order to show cause (publish an opinion). The Court of Appeal again denied the petition, this time with a published opinion. Pavlovich then appealed this ruling to the California Supreme Court which granted review.

== Issue ==
Whether the trial court properly exercised jurisdiction over Pavlovich based solely on the posting of the DeCSS source code on the LiVid Web site.

== Holding ==
A court may exercise specific jurisdiction over a nonresident defendant only if:

1. the defendant has purposefully availed himself or herself of forum benefits
2. the controversy is related to or arises out of the defendant's contacts with the forum and
3. the assertion of personal jurisdiction would comport with fair play and substantial justice (internal quotations and citations omitted)

The court held that the purposeful availment requirement is only met when "the defendant purposefully and voluntarily directs his activities toward the forum so that he should expect, by virtue of the benefit he receives, to be subject to the court's jurisdiction based on his contacts with the forum" Purposeful availment was further defined by the United States Supreme Court in Calder v. Jones. In Calder the Court developed the effects test and found personal jurisdiction over a defendant who had no prior contacts with the forum state. While courts have adopted different variations of the effects test, the California Supreme Court held that the following two requirements must be met

1. the defendant must have expressly aimed at or targeted intentional conduct at the forum state and
2. the defendant must have known that his intentional conduct would cause harm in the forum

In applying these standards to the facts, the court found that Pavlovich had not expressly aimed his tortious conduct at or intentionally targeted California. The Court stated that "Pavlovich's sole contact with California is LiVid's posting of the DeCSS source code containing DVD CCA's proprietary information on an Internet Web site accessible to any person with Internet access. Pavlovich never worked in California. He owned no property in California, maintained no bank accounts in California, and had no telephone listings in California. Neither Pavlovich nor his company solicited or transacted any business in California"

The court found persuasive the fact that the Web site was purely "passive" in that it was not interactive with visitors, or the posting of information was the extent of the site. Additionally the court noted that there was no evidence that Pavlovich knew DVD CCA's principal place of business was in California.

DVD CCA insisted that Pavlovich's knowledge that the motion picture industry and computer industry were centered in California and could be harmed by his tortious conduct was enough to satisfy the express aiming requirement. But the court was not moved by this argument, finding that Pavlovich's knowledge that a third-party might use the DeCSS code to illegally pirate copyrighted materials did not qualify as express aiming. Additionally, the court found no evidence that Pavlovich actually knew that any licensees of the CSS program were in California finding that:

"At most, the record establishes that Pavlovich should have guessed that these licensees resided in California because there are many consumer electronic and computer companies in California. DVD CCA's argument therefore boils down to the following syllogism: jurisdiction exists solely because Pavlovich's tortious conduct had a foreseeable effect in California. But mere foreseeability is not enough for jurisdiction"

The court emphasized that knowledge of the possibility of harm in the forum cannot be enough, that to allow jurisdiction on these facts would be to impermissibly ignore the express aiming requirement of the effects test.

=== Dissent ===
The dissent disagreed that Pavlovich had not expressly aimed his conduct at the motion picture industry and computer industry which the record supported that he knew were centered in California, stating:

"The DeCSS source code was posted on defendant Pavlovich's LiVid Web site as part of a widespread effort to defeat the CSS encryption system jointly developed by the movie and DVD industries for their mutual protection and benefit. DeCSS was posted on the LiVid Web site despite Pavlovich's assumption that DeCSS illegally infringed the licensed trade secret represented by CSS. Pavlovich, a technical expert in this area, knew CSS was intended to protect copyrighted materials on DVD's from unauthorized duplication, and also to limit DVD playback to systems with CSS technology. Indeed LiVid's goal in defeating CSS was to develop an alternative, and presumably competitive, 'open source' DVD playback system. Thus, the intended injurious effects of posting DeCSS were aimed directly at the computer hardware industry involved in producing CSS-encrypted DVD players—an industry Pavlovich knew was heavily concentrated in California"
