= Rick Boucher =

American politician (born 1946)

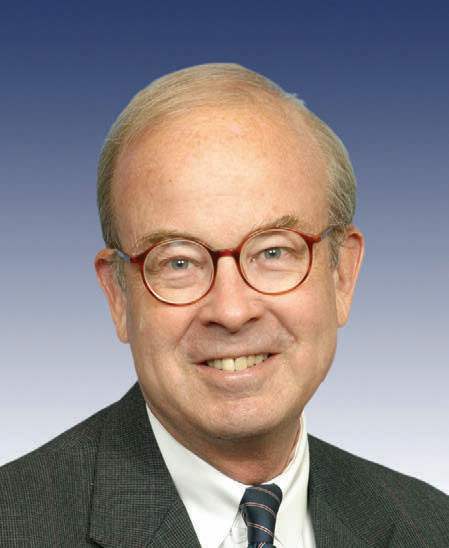
- Official portrait, 2005

Member of the U.S. House of Representatives from Virginia's 9th district
- In office January 3, 1983 – January 3, 2011
- Preceded by: William Wampler
- Succeeded by: Morgan Griffith

Member of the Virginia Senate from the 39th district
- In office November 28, 1975 – December 27, 1982
- Preceded by: George M. Warren Jr.
- Succeeded by: James Jones

Personal details
- Born: Frederick Carlyle Boucher; August 1, 1946 (age 80) Abingdon, Virginia, U.S.
- Party: Democratic
- Spouse: Amy Hauslohner
- Education: Roanoke College (BA); University of Virginia (JD)
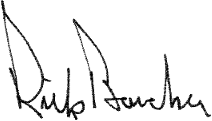
- Signature
- Boucher's voice Boucher opposing Patriot Act's reauthorization. Recorded July 21, 2005

Frederick Carlyle Boucher (/ˈbaʊtʃər/; born August 1, 1946) is an American politician and attorney who served as the U.S. representative for Virginia's 9th congressional district from 1983 to 2011. The district, which is massively rural, covers the majority of southwest Virginia. A member of the Democratic Party, he was defeated in his bid for re-election by Republican Morgan Griffith in 2010.

== Early life, education and career ==
Boucher is a native of Abingdon, Virginia, where he currently lives. He earned his BA from Roanoke College where he was a member of Kappa Alpha Order fraternity. He received his J.D. degree from the University of Virginia School of Law. He has practiced law on Wall Street initially as an associate at Milbank Tweed in the firm's New York City office, and later in Virginia. Prior to his election to Congress, he served for seven years as a member of the Senate of Virginia, initially taking office in 1975, after defeating conservative incumbent George M. Warren Jr. to win the Democratic nomination for the seat. He is a former member of the Law and Justice Committee of the National Conference of State Legislatures, the Board of Directors of the First Virginia Bank of Damascus, Virginia, and the Board of Directors of Client Centered Legal Services of Southwest Virginia. He also formerly served on the Advisory Board of Virginia Cares Inc.

== U.S. House of Representatives ==
=== Political campaigns ===
Boucher was first elected to Congress in 1982, defeating 16-year Republican incumbent Bill Wampler by 1,100 votes. He was narrowly reelected in 1984, defeating Delegate Jefferson Stafford by four points, even as Ronald Reagan carried the 9th in a landslide. However, he was completely unopposed for a third term in 1986, and was reelected 11 more times without serious difficulty.

Boucher remained very popular in his district even as its socially conservative tint made it friendlier to Republicans. The GOP won most of the area's seats in the Virginia General Assembly in 2001, and has held them ever since. From 2002 to 2006, he fended off three reasonably well-funded Republican challengers with relative ease. In 2002, he defeated state delegate Jay Katzen with 66 percent of the vote. In 2004, he defeated NASCAR official Kevin Triplett with 59 percent of the vote even as George W. Bush easily carried the district. In 2006, he defeated state delegate Bill Carrico with 68 percent of the vote. He was reelected unopposed in 2008 even as John McCain carried the district with his largest margin in the state. It was generally thought that Boucher would be succeeded by a Republican once he retired.

==== 2010 ====
In 2010 Boucher faced his strongest opponent to date in House of Delegates Majority Leader Morgan Griffith. Boucher charged that Griffith lived outside of the 9th (Griffith's home in Salem was indeed just outside the 9th's borders), though members of the House are only required to live in the state they represent. However, it was not enough to overcome Griffith's attacks that Boucher was an ally of Barack Obama and Nancy Pelosi. Ultimately, Griffith unseated Boucher with 51 percent of the vote to Boucher's 46 percent. No Democrat has crossed the 40 percent mark in the district since Boucher left office.

== Committee assignments ==
- Committee on Energy and Commerce
  - Subcommittee on Communications, Technology and the Internet (Chair)
  - Subcommittee on Energy and Air Quality (Chair)
- Committee on the Judiciary
  - Subcommittee on Courts and Competition Policy

Boucher served in the House Democratic leadership as an assistant whip from 1985 to 2010.

== Political positions ==
Boucher has been active on Internet-related legislation, including cosponsoring the High Performance Computing and Communication Act of 1991. He chaired the Science Subcommittee of the House Committee on Science and Technology and through hearings oversaw the transition of the Internet from a National Science Foundation managed government research project (known as NSFnet) to the private sector. In that role, he authored the legislation which permitted the first commercial use of the Internet. His proposals to promote competition in the cable and local telephone industries contributed to the enactment of the Telecommunications Act of 1996.

Boucher originated the House Internet Caucus and served as its co-chairman (1996-2011). He also authored the Digital Media Consumers' Rights Act (DMCRA) legislation and introduced the FAIR USE Act. He was named Politician of the Year for 2006 by the Association of American Libraries' Library Journal, largely due to his efforts to protect the fair use doctrine and expand Internet technologies to rural areas.

Boucher voted in favor of the Auto Industry Financing and Restructuring Act, as well as the Emergency Economic Stabilization Act of 2008 and the American Recovery and Reinvestment Act of 2009.

Boucher has received a rating of "A+" and endorsement from the NRA Political Victory Fund between 2004 and 2010. He is one of the 81 House Democrats who voted in favor of authorizing the invasion of Iraq.

Boucher is a strong opponent of tax patents and has introduced bills to either have them banned or to exempt tax attorneys and tax payers from liability in infringing them.

In June 2009, Boucher voted in favor of the American Clean Energy and Security Act which, if enacted, would establish a cap-and-trade system. Boucher was chairman of the energy sub-committee of the previous Congress which first drafted the legislation, and was deemed to be instrumental in the bills development. Boucher opened his pre-vote remarks on the bill by saying that he was in "strong support of the bill."

In November 2009, Boucher, along with 39 other Democratic members of the House, voted against the Affordable Health Care for America Act. Also, on March 21, 2010, Boucher voted against the Patient Protection and Affordable Care Act and the Health Care and Education Reconciliation Act of 2010.

Rick Boucher endorsed Barack Obama for the Democratic nomination for president, while his district went solidly for Hillary Clinton.

In 2007, Congress.org ranked Rick Boucher as the 10th most powerful member of the U.S. House of Representatives.

== Post-congressional career ==
In May 2011, Boucher joined prominent Washington law firm Sidley Austin and was charged with leading their government strategies practice. The Internet Innovation Alliance (IIA), an industry advocacy group, also announced that Boucher has joined as the honorary chair. The IIA includes among its members AT&T and Americans for Tax Reform and has focused on expanding broadband access and adoption with particular emphasis on increased mobile connectivity for underserved and rural communities.

== Electoral history ==
Virginia's 9th congressional district: Results 1982–2010
Year	Democratic	Votes	Pct	Republican	Votes	Pct	3rd Party	Party	Votes	Pct
1982	Rick Boucher	76,227	50%	William Wampler	75,009	50%				
1984	Rick Boucher	102,446	52%	Jefferson Stafford	94,510	48%				
1986	Rick Boucher	59,864	99%	no candidate			Write-ins		602	1%
1988	Rick Boucher	113,309	63%	John Brown	65,410	37%				
1990	Rick Boucher	67,215	97%	no candidate			Write-ins		2,015	2%
1992	Rick Boucher	133,284	63%	Gary Weddle	77,985	37%				
1994	Rick Boucher	153,311	59%	Steve Fast	72,133	41%				
1996	Rick Boucher	122,908	65%	Patrick Craig Muldoon	58,055	31%	Tom Roberts	Virginia Reform	8,080	4%
1998	Rick Boucher	87,163	61%	Joe Barta	55,918	39%				
2000	Rick Boucher	137,488	70%	Michael Osborne	59,335	30%				
2002	Rick Boucher	100,075	66%	Jay Katzen	52,076	34%				
2004	Rick Boucher	150,039	59%	Kevin Triplett	98,499	39%	Seth Davis	Independent	4,341	2%
2006	Rick Boucher	129,705	68%	Bill Carrico	61,574	32%				
2008	Rick Boucher	207,306	97%	no candidate			Write-ins		6,264	3%
2010	Rick Boucher	86,743	46%	Morgan Griffith	95,726	51%	Jeremiah Heaton	Independent	4,282	2%

== Personal life ==
Boucher announced his engagement at age 59 to Amy Hauslohner, an editor of the Galax Gazette in Galax, Virginia. Said Boucher of the engagement "We have decided since I will be 60 in August and she just turned 50 last week, we probably are mature enough to handle marriage." Boucher and Houslohner were married on June 3, 2006.

U.S. House of Representatives
Preceded by William Wampler	Member of the U.S. House of Representatives from Virginia's 9th congressional district 1983–2011	Succeeded by Morgan Griffith
U.S. order of precedence (ceremonial)
Preceded by Collin Peterson as Former U.S. Representative	Order of precedence of the United States as Former U.S. Representative	Succeeded by Peter T. King as Former U.S. Representative
