= United States v. Elcom Ltd. =

Copyright case between Dmitry and Elcomsoft

U.S. v. ElcomSoft and Dmitry Sklyarov
- Court: U.S. District Court for the Northern District of California, San Jose Division
- Full case name: United States of America versus Elcom Ltd., also known as ElcomSoft Co. Ltd., and Dmitry Sklyarov
- Decided: ElcomSoft acquitted by a federal jury on December 17, 2002

Case history
- Prior actions: Dmitry Sklyarov dropped from prosecution in exchange for agreeing to testify and to leave the U.S.

United States v. ElcomSoft and Dmitry Sklyarov was a 2001–2002 criminal case in which Dmitry Sklyarov and his employer ElcomSoft were charged with alleged violation of the DMCA. The case raised some concerns of civil rights and legal process in the United States, and ended in the charges against Sklyarov dropped and Elcomsoft ruled not guilty under the applicable jurisdiction.

Charges laid in the case were trafficking in, and offering to the public, a software program that could circumvent technological protections on copyrighted material, in violation of Section 1201(b)(1)(A)&(C) of Title 17 of the United States Code (the Copyright Acts, including most of the Digital Millennium Copyright Act), as well as Sections 2 (Aiding and Abetting) and 371 (Conspiracy) of Title 18, Part I, of the United States Code (the Federal Criminal Code).

== Details ==
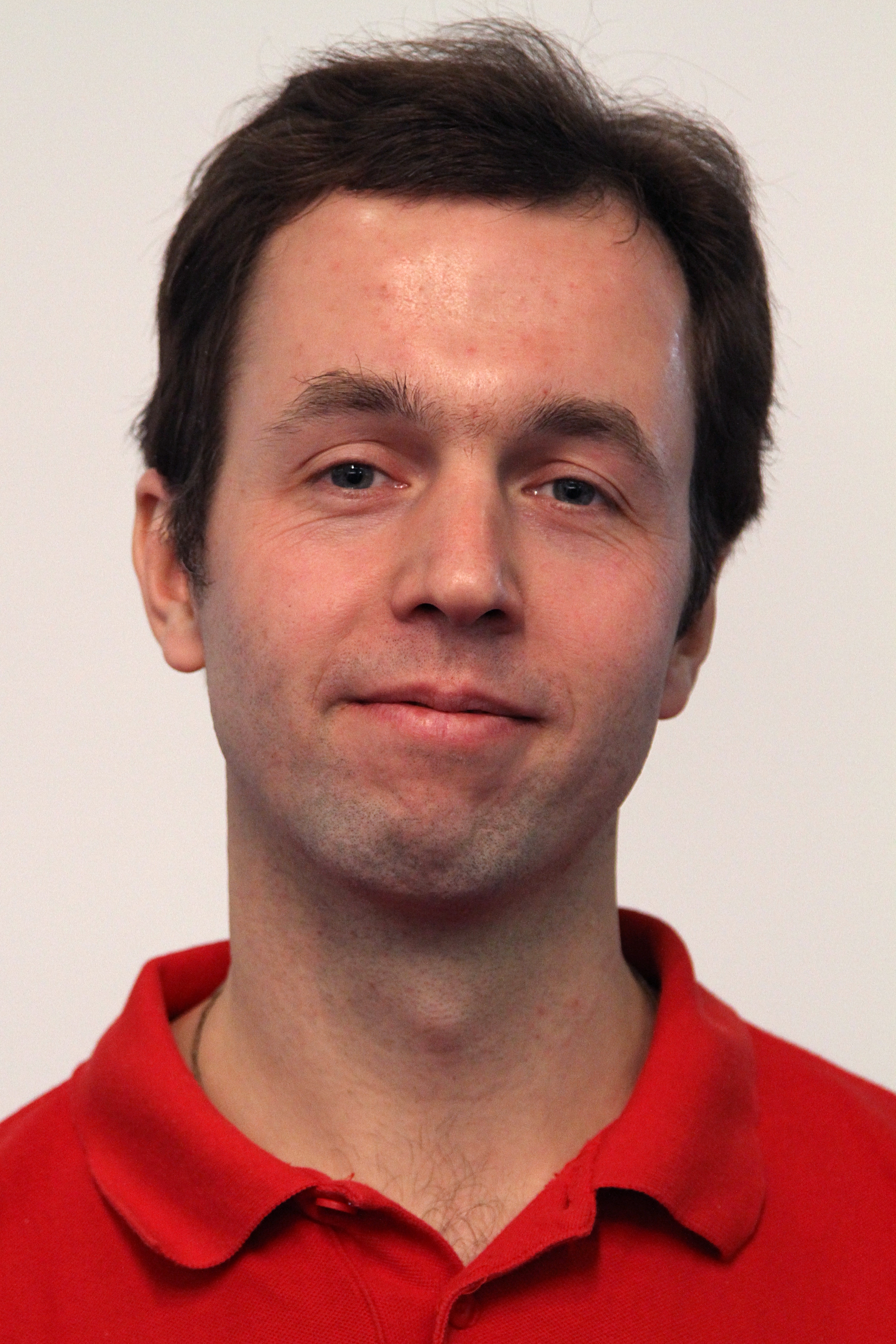
Dmitry Sklyarov in 2010

Dmitry Sklyarov, a Russian citizen employed by the Russian company ElcomSoft, visited the U.S. to give a presentation called "eBook's Security – Theory and Practice" at the DEF CON convention in Las Vegas, Nevada. On July 16, 2001, as he was about to return to Moscow, Sklyarov was arrested by the FBI and jailed for allegedly violating the United States' Digital Millennium Copyright Act (of 1998) by writing ElcomSoft's Advanced eBook Processor software.

The purpose of Sklyarov's presentation was to show that Adobe was careless, and violated the rights of authors by using a security system that was unapproved by professional cryptologists, and applying the system to the fast growing electronic books market.

The original issue came to the attention of prosecutors when Adobe Systems, a U.S. company, complained that copy protection arrangements in its e-book file format were being illegally circumvented by ElcomSoft's product. Adobe withdrew its complaint, but United States Department of Justice prosecutors (under the authority of local U.S. Attorney Robert S. Mueller, future Director of the FBI) declined to likewise drop the charges. This was because it was found that ElcomSoft had contracted with an American company, RegNow, to sell copies of the Advanced eBook Processor software and accept payment information from American citizens. Thus, the case had merit in US federal court. However, ElcomSoft's product, and thus presumably the efforts of its employees including Sklyarov, were entirely legal in Russia. Sklyarov was eventually released on bail, but forced to remain in California, separated from his family, until his case concluded.

The day after his arrest, several web sites and mailing lists coordinated from the website freesklyarov.org started to organize protests, many of them under the slogan "Free Dmitry" or "Free Sklyarov". The main point of these campaigns was that no DMCA violations were committed at DEF CON, and that the DMCA does not apply in Russia, so Sklyarov was being arrested for something that was perfectly legal in his jurisdiction. A campaign to boycott Adobe products was also launched.

On July 19, 2001, the Association of American Publishers issued a press release announcing their support of his arrest.

After Sklyarov was arrested he was held briefly at the North Las Vegas Detention Center; then he was held in the Oklahoma City Federal Prisoner Transfer Center until August 3, 2001, when he was transferred to the Federal building in San Jose, California. On August 6, 2001, Sklyarov was released on a US $50,000 bail and was not allowed to leave Northern California.

The U.S. government agreed to drop all charges filed against Sklyarov, provided that he testify at the trial of his company. He was permitted to return to Russia on December 13, 2001.

On December 17, 2002, after a two-week trial in San Jose, California, a federal jury found ElcomSoft not guilty of all four charges under the DMCA.

The case raised some concerns particularly since it involved an individual being prosecuted for activities that were fully legal in the country where they occurred.

Bruce Chizen, CEO of Adobe Systems, commented on the case in an interview with CNET:

Looking back with 20/20, I wish that we could have had better communication with ElcomSoft, Dmitry Sklyarov and the EFF (Electronic Frontier Foundation) before the whole thing went public. I'm sorry that we weren't able to do that, because I think we could have resolved a lot of the issues.

== See also ==
- Fair use
