= BALANCE Act =

The Benefit Authors without Limiting Advancement or Net Consumer Expectations (BALANCE) Act of 2003 was a bill that would've amended Title 17 of the United States Code, "to safeguard the rights and expectations of consumers who lawfully obtain digital entertainment." The bill was proposed in the 108th Congress as H.R. 1066 by Congresswoman Zoe Lofgren (D-CA). In the 109th Congress, the bill was reintroduced and is numbered H.R. 4536. It has not been introduced into the 110th Congress.
