= List of CD and DVD copy protection schemes =

This is a list of notable CD and DVD copy protection schemes.

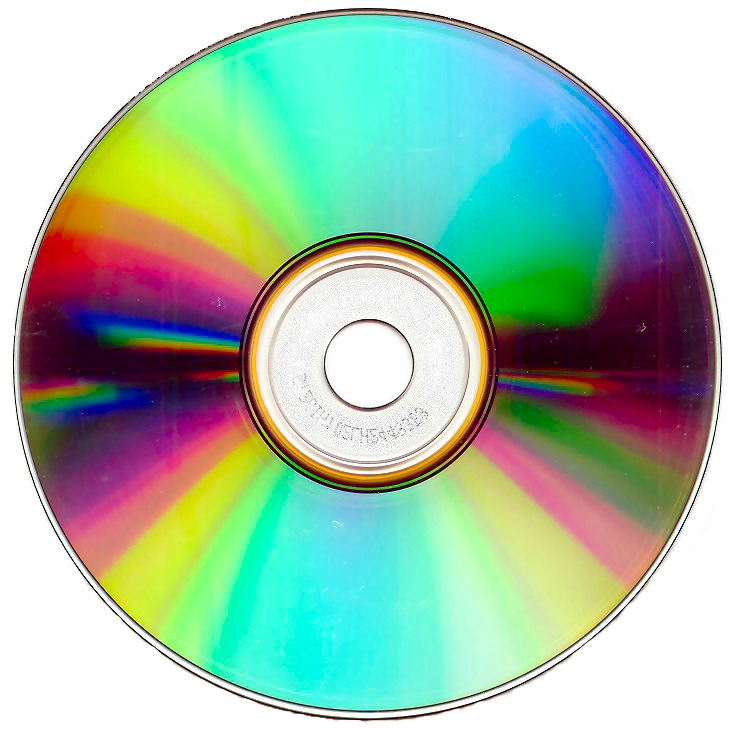
CD-ROM disc

For other medias, see List of Copy Protection Schemes.

== Commercial CD protection schemes ==
CD-Cops
Requires the user to enter CD-code (or reads embedded CD-code) that describes geometry of CD to correctly locate data on the disc.
SafeDisc (versions 1–4)
Adds unique digital signature at the time of manufacturing which is designed to be difficult to copy or transfer so that software is able to detect copied media.
SafeCast
The encryption key will expire after pre-determined date so the media can be used only temporarily. Also used to implement trial editions of programs.
Secure Digital Music Initiative
Industry led attempt to add watermarking to CDs. The group challenged researchers to break the DRM and then threatened a lawsuit when the researchers were successful.
SecuROM
Limits the number of PCs activated at the same time from the same key.
StarForce
Asks for Serial ID at install or startup to verify the license.
TAGES
Verifies authentic copy by checking existence of "twin sectors" which are sectors with same logical address but different data. However, twin sectors may be hard to read in order to copy but are easy to write.

== Commercial DVD protection schemes ==
Analog Protection System
Adds pulses to analog video signals to negatively impact the AGC circuit of a recording device so the images on copied DVDs become garbled.
Sony ARccOS Protection
Inserting corrupted sectors in areas where normal players will not access but ripping software does to trigger errors during replication.
Burst Cutting Area
Writing barcode in circular area near the center of the disc (referred to as burst cutting area) which cannot be written without using special equipment.
Content Scramble System
An encryption system to prevent copying.
DVD-Cops
See CD-Cops in previous section.
DVD region code
Restricts region where media can be played by matching region number with configuration flag in DVD players.
LaserLock
Includes hidden directory on the CD containing corrupted data which will cause errors while being copied.
SafeDisc (version 1-4)
See SafeDisc (versions 1-4) in previous section.
SecuROM
See previous section.
StarForce
See previous section.
TAGES
See previous section.

== Commercial Audio CD/DVD protection schemes ==
Cactus Data Shield
Works by intentionally violating Red Book CD Digital Audio standards, such as erroneous disc navigation and corrupted data, preventing successful ripping of the data. However, the original disc itself does not play correctly in some CD/DVD players.
Wavy data track
Discs' data track is wavy instead of straight, so only discs with the same wavy-shaped data track will be playable.
Extended Copy Protection (XCP)
Installs software on the computer after agreement to EULA at the first time the media is inserted, and the software will watch for any ripper software trying to access the CD-drive. This copy protection can be defeated simply by using a computer that is not running Microsoft Windows, not using an account with administrative privileges, or preventing the installer from running, and has long since been discontinued due to a public relations disaster caused by the software behaving identically to a rootkit.
Key2Audio
Another deliberate violation of the Red Book standard intended to make the CD play only on CD players and not on computers by applying bogus data track onto the disc during manufacturing, which CD players will ignore as non-audio tracks. The system could be disabled by tracing the outer edge of a CD with a felt-tip marker.
MediaMax CD3
Installs software on the computer that tries to play the media so other software cannot read data directly from audio discs in the CD-ROM drive. Silently installing software on a computer created a controversy about modifying a computer's behaviour without a user's consent.

== Console CD/DVD protection schemes ==
Dreamcast (GD-ROM)
Multiple table of contents (TOC) made normal CD players unable read beyond the first track. However, one could read GD-ROM on CD reader by swapping the disc after reading fake TOC.
FADE
Creates fake scratches on the disk image which copying programs will automatically try to fix. Instead of alerting the user that the copied disc is detected, the program will play the game in a buggy manner.
PlayStation (CD-ROM)
The authority pattern pressed on internal circumference of the media, which could not be copied, is used to detect authorized copies. Some titles also use the Libcrypt mechanism to validate the disc by using checksum as magic number to subroutines.
PlayStation 2 (CD-ROM, DVD-ROM)
A map file that contains all of the exact positions and file size info of the disc is stored at a position that is beyond the file limit. The game calls this place directly so that burned copy with no data beyond file limit cannot be played.
PSP (Universal Media Disc)
Since no blank media or writer exists, the media itself cannot be copied, but one could make ISO image (a file version of the UMD) on a memory card. The unique format also made the media expensive and difficult to adapt.
Xbox (CD-ROM, DVD-ROM)
Two sets of media descriptors are used. Initially, and on typical DVD-ROM drives, only a short partition containing a brief DVD Video can be seen. The lead-out section of the disk stores a second set of media descriptors describing the bounds of the main partition. It also contains a partially-encrypted "security sector" used for further authentication. The lead-out area is not typically directly accessible with consumer DVD-ROM hardware. Furthermore, the key for the security sector is located in the sector's raw header. This header information, unlike the raw headers of CD-ROM disks, is not accessible by default on nearly all DVD-ROM drives. Additional "challenges" are implemented in the security sector through a table, with more challenge types added over the lifespan of Xbox and Xbox 360. These include, as an example from their earliest form, checks for unreadable sectors in predetermined ranges.

== See also ==
- List of copy protection schemes
