= Comparison of DVD ripper software =

This article lists DVD ripper software capable of ripping and converting DVD discs, ISO image files or DVD folders to computer, mobile handsets and media players supported file formats.

== General information ==
Note: Applications with a purple background are no longer in development.

Product name	Author	First public release	Stable version	Cost	Software license	Written in
Aimersoft DVD Ripper	Aimersoft Studio	?	?	Cost	Proprietary	?
AnyDVD	RedFox	3 July 2003	8.7.1.1 (13 July 2024; 2 years ago) [±]	Cost	Proprietary	?
DVD43	?	?	1.0.0.6 (February 2013; 13 years ago) [±]	No cost	Proprietary	Delphi
DVDFab DVD Ripper	Fengtao Software	?	?	Freemium	Proprietary	C, C++, ASM
Freemake Video Converter	Ellora Assets Corporation	1 July 2010	4.1.12 (23 December 2020; 5 years ago) [±]	Freemium	Proprietary	?
HandBrake	HandBrake Team	24 August 2003	1.10.1 (23 August 2025; 11 months ago) [±]	No cost	GPL-2.0-only	Objective-C, C, C#
K3b	Sebastian Trüg	22 April 2009	25.12.0 11 December 2025; 8 months ago	No cost	GPL-2.0-only	C++
K9Copy	Jean-Michel Petit	18 January 2006	3.0.3 (16 October 2014; 11 years ago) [±]	No cost	GPL-2.0-or-later	C, C++
Leawo DVD Ripper	Leawo software	?	8.3.0.3 [±]	Cost	Proprietary	?
MacTheRipper	?	?	?	Cost	Proprietary	C
Magic DVD Ripper	Magic DVD Software	?	10.0.1 (12 July 2019; 7 years ago) [±]	Cost	Proprietary	?
RipIt	The Little App Factory	?	?	Cost	Proprietary	Objective-C, C
Thoggen	Tim-Philipp Müller	?	0.7.1	No cost	GPL-2.0-or-later	C
WinX DVD Ripper Platinum	Digiarty Software	2009	8.22.2 (December 21, 2023)	Cost	Proprietary	?
Xilisoft DVD to Video	Xilisoft Corporation	?	?	Cost	Proprietary	?

== Supported software & hardware, user interface ==
This table lists the operating systems compatibility

Product name	Windows	macOS	Linux	BSD	Unix/Other	GUI	CLI	Batch	GPU Acceleration
Aimersoft DVD Ripper	XP-8 (32/64-bit)	Yes	No	No	No	Yes	?	?	?
AnyDVD	98-7(32/64bit); HD:2K-7(32/64bit)	No	No	No	No	Yes	No	No	?
CloneDVD	98-7(32/64bit) mo:2K-7(32/64bit)	No	No	No	mobile devices	Yes	No	No	?
DVD Decrypter	9x-7(32bit)	No	No	No	No	Yes	No	No	?
DVD Shrink	9x/2K/XP(32bit)	No	No	No	No	Yes	No	No	No
DVD X Copy	2K-Vista(32/64bit)	No	No	No	No	Yes	No	No	?
DVD43	2K-8(32/64bit)	No	No	No	No	Yes	No	No	?
DVDFab	XP-10 (32/64-bit)	10.7+	No	No	No	Yes	Yes	Yes	Yes
FormatFactory	ALL(32bit)	No	No	No	No	Yes	No	No	?
Freemake Video Converter	XP-8.1	No	No	No	No	Yes	?	?	?
HandBrake	XP-11(32/64bit)	Intel, 10.6+	x86/x86 64	No	No	Yes	Yes	Yes	yes (QSV)
K9Copy	No	No	deb/rpm	Yes	POSIX	Yes	No	No	?
Leawo DVD Ripper	XP-8.1	No	No	No	No	Yes	?	?	?
MacTheRipper	No	10.2+	No	No	No	Yes	No	No	?
Magic DVD Ripper	98-7(32/64bit) mo:2K-7(32/64bit)	No	No	No	No	Yes	No	Yes	?
RipIt	No	10.5+	No	No	No	Yes	No	No	?
Thoggen	No	No	Yes	Yes	POSIX	Yes	No	No	?
WinX DVD Ripper Platinum	98-10(32/64bit)	No	No	No	No	Yes	No	No	Yes
Xilisoft DVD to Video	XP SP2-8 (Unofficial)	No	No	No	No	Yes	?	?	?
Product name	Windows	Mac OS X	Linux	BSD	Unix/Other OS	GUI	CLI	Batch	GPU Acceleration

== Disabling DRM ==
Note: As at 2009-12-10 much of the data below is based on available wiki-pages, official website pages & some limited user experience (i.e. where this table reads 'Yes' OR 'No', may be true OR may in fact need to read 'Partial', or 'Obsolete' as many encryption methods may change over time.)

Product name	Region	RCE	UOP	CSS	Macrovision ACP	FluxDVD	Protect	ARccOS	AACS	BD+	ROM Mark	BD-Live
AnyDVD	Yes	Yes	Yes	Yes	Yes	Yes	Yes	Yes	Yes	Yes	Yes	Partial
CloneDVD	No	No	No	No	No	No	No	No	No	No	No	No
DVD Decrypter	Yes	No	Yes	Partial	Partial	No	No	No	No	No	No	No
DVD Shrink	Yes	No	Yes	Partial	Partial	No	No	No	No	No	No	No
DVD X Copy	Yes	No	Yes	Partial	Partial	No	No	No	No	No	No	No
DVD43	Yes	No	Yes	Yes	Yes	No	No	No	No	No	No	No
FormatFactory	Yes	No	Yes	Yes	Yes	No	No	No	No	No	No	No
K9Copy	Yes	No	Yes	Yes	Yes	No	No	No	No	No	No	No
MacTheRipper	Yes	Yes	Yes	Partial	Partial	No	No	No	No	No	No	No
RipIt	Yes	No	No	Yes	Yes	No	Yes	Partial	No	No	No	No
Thoggen	Yes	No	Yes	Yes	Yes	No	No	No	No	No	No	No
WinX DVD Ripper Platinum	Yes	Yes	Yes	Yes	Yes	No	No	Yes	No	No	No	No
Product name	Region	RCE	UOP	CSS	Macrovision	FluxDVD	Protect	ARccOS	AACS	BD+	ROM Mark	BD-Live

== Input files supported ==
Product name	DVD disc	ISO image file	DVD folder	IFO file
Aimersoft DVD Ripper	Yes	Yes	Yes	Yes
DVDFab DVD Ripper	Yes	Yes	Yes	No
Freemake Video Converter	Yes	No	Yes	No
Leawo DVD Ripper	Yes	Yes	Yes	No
Magic DVD Ripper	Yes	No	Yes	No
WinX DVD Ripper Platinum	Yes	Yes	Yes	No
Xilisoft DVD to Video	Yes	Yes	Yes	Yes

== Output files supported ==
Product name	Audio	Video			Image
Product name	Audio	Common video formats	HD video formats	3D video formats	Image
Aimersoft DVD Ripper	Yes	Yes	Yes	Yes	Yes
DVDFab DVD Ripper	Yes	Yes	Yes	Yes	Yes
Freemake Video Converter	Yes	Yes	No	No	No
Leawo DVD Ripper	Yes	Yes	Yes	Yes	Yes
Magic DVD Ripper	Yes	Yes	No	No	No
WinX DVD Ripper Platinum	Yes	Yes	Yes	No	Yes
Xilisoft DVD to Video	Yes	Yes	Yes	Yes	Yes

== See also ==
- Blu-ray ripper
- CD_ripper
