= Tagès =

Software copy protection system

- Developer: Tagès SA
- Stable release: 5.5.7.2 / 2009
- Operating system: Microsoft Windows
- Type: Digital rights management
- License: Proprietary
- Website: www.tagesprotection.com

Tagès was a software copy protection system, jointly developed, at first, by MPO and the Thales Group (formerly known as Thomson-CSF) starting in 1999. Its method of protection has since been described as twin sectors.

The name 'Tages' originates in the Etruscan mythology, where it functions as the Latin spelling for an alias of a minor deity, Tarchies.

The first software product to be protected by Tagès was a PC game, Moto Racer 3, developed by Delphine Software (DSI) and released in 2001.

In 2003, an independent company, Tagès SA, was formed. The company focuses on the development of copy protection and digital rights management systems, and is now the sole vendor of the Tagès copy protection system.

The Tagès copy protection system is compatible with the Microsoft Windows operating system, and is employed on CD and DVD discs.

The makers of Tagès claim that one of the main strengths of their product is the incorporation of a "Secure Area" on a physical medium, which renders the production of a relatively perfect copy of a protected disc a nearly impossible task. Additionally, a set of anti-cracking instruments is being provided with the protection system (such as TAGESCAP, Tagès APIs and Tagès VFS); this is claimed to make the reverse-engineering of Tagès-protected applications a difficult and time-consuming task.

== Features ==
- TAGESCAP - A binary wrapper which is applied to the software application's executable file and requires no changes to the source code of the application. It provides the encryption of the protected product's executable file(s), and attempts to protect the application against debugging, disassembly, reverse-engineering, and other forms of analysis. The authentication procedure only carries out a single check, which will be carried out at the start-up of the protected application.
- Tagès APIs - A set of libraries allowing the developer to implement a set of fully customized "protection triggers", potentially appearing at any stage of the protected application's execution phase. For instance, should a non-authentic copy of a protected product be detected, the developer of that software product can decide upon the actions to be taken under such circumstances, such as electing to silently degrade some aspects of the product's functionality. The Tagès APIs require modifications and additions to the source code of the protected application. A consequence of silently degrading or crashing a program that fails authentication is that users have no way of distinguishing between intentional protection behavior and application bugs. This has resulted in support centers receiving large volumes of calls that were eventually determined to be for unauthorized copies.
- Tagès VFS - An encrypted virtual file system, allowing the developer to additionally encrypt non-executable content. When a successfully authenticated protected application runs, it has transparent access to the original, decrypted content; this functionality is achieved by means of a device driver. Should a protected application's authentication phase be successfully removed by means of deliberate circumvention, the encrypted content is not decrypted and is therefore read in as garbage data, resulting in erroneous program behavior. However, just as the encryption of the executable can be broken, so too can the encryption for the VFS, with additional effort.

== Tagès device drivers ==
As with most optical disc-based copy protection systems (such as SafeDisc, StarForce, etc.), Tagès installs its own device drivers as a part of the copy protection system. The Tagès device drivers are installed on the first launch of any Tagès-protected application.

=== Removal ===
Tagès SA provides an official, standalone, device driver installation and uninstallation program. This program functions as a toggle; once the Tagès device drivers are installed, the program will function as an uninstaller, otherwise, it will function as an installer. Both 32-bit and 64-bit versions of the program are available.

== Known issues ==
- Tagès may be used to bind an activated game copy to the hardware configuration in the time the game was installed. This has led to issues in some games where even slightly modifying the hardware (e.g. replacing the graphic card) would require reactivating the game (either by using up one of the limited extra activations provided by the game publisher, or trying to request activation renewal from technical support).

== External links and references ==
- Tagès SA (requires Adobe Flash Player)
- MPO
- Technical details at CDFreaks.
- Tagès Technical Workings (2007)
