= ACE (video game) =

1985 video game

- ZX Spectrum box cover
- Developer: Cascade Games
- Publishers: UK: Cascade Games; NA: UXB
- Programmer: Ian Martin
- Artist: Damon Redmond
- Platforms: Commodore 16, Plus/4, VIC-20, Commodore 64, ZX Spectrum, Amstrad CPC, Amstrad PCW, Amiga
- Release: UK: 1985; NA: 1986
- Genre: Combat flight simulator
- Mode: Single-player

ACE (an acronym for Air Combat Emulator) is a combat flight simulator video game published for the Commodore 64, VIC-20, and Plus/4 in 1985 by Cascade Games. Conversions were released for the Amstrad CPC, Amstrad PCW, Amiga, and ZX Spectrum. The player takes the role of a fighter jet pilot defending the English coastland against an enemy invasion, having to fight off aerial, ground and naval forces while Allied bases evacuate. The display shows the plane's instrumentation and cockpit view. The game was developed with a budget of £40k by the small UK-based Cascade Games.

ACE was lauded by critics as one of the best air combat simulators of the time and praised for its accessible gameplay. Two sequels followed from Cascade Games.

== Plot ==
ACE is set on the Southern coastland of England during an enemy invasion against the remaining Allied forces. The player takes the role of a fighter plane pilot, who must defeat the invasion. To accomplish this, the player pilots one of the three available Mark 2.1 AWAT (All-Weather All-Terrain) combat aircraft and is charged with defending the last three Allied airbases being evacuated in front of the enemy's advance. Despite being the lone defender and greatly outnumbered, they must fight enemy forces on all fronts: aerial, ground and naval. The player progresses through the game engaging different contingents of the invaders. Initially, they must intercept enemy fighter planes, helicopters and landing ground forces, including tanks, land bases and SAM sites. Once the enemy is sufficiently driven back, the player can engage the naval fleet.

== Gameplay ==
The player performing aerial refueling using boom and receptacle system (C64)

At the start of the game, the player is presented with a range of options that determine the experience. The game offers nine selectable levels of difficulty, including a tutorial mode where the enemy forces do not fire back. Among the options, the player can choose to play either in summer or winter time and either daytime or nighttime, altering the scenery. The player must choose from the range of weapons that will be mounted on their AWAT plane. These include air-to-air, air-to-ground, air-to-sea and multipurpose missiles, depending on what enemies the player chooses to engage. In addition, the plane is equipped with a machine gun and decoy flares against hostile missiles.

The in-game screen shows the cockpit view split between top half for plane's front view and bottom half for plane's instrumentation. The control panel shows the plane's crucial data, including speed, altitude, thrust, fuel, roll/pitch indicators and a compass. The panel also features a radar that provides an overview of important nearby objects. An onboard screen displays various flight information and warning messages, and features a speech synthesizer that occasionally announces dangers, such as approaching enemies or missile attacks. Finally, a small rear-view camera allows the player to observe enemies and missiles on their tail. The game also features a two player mode, where one player flies the plane and the other aims and fires the guns.

At the start of the game, the player has to take off the runway at an Allied base. Afterwards they can fly around and look for enemies to engage. The player can open their Satellite Intelligence Map, which shows a live map of the immediate coastline with items of interest, such as, friendly bases, enemy positions, and refuelling locations. The player can perform various flight manoeuvres and stunts mid-air, such as loops, rolls, or dummy stalls. Flying, especially at high altitudes, expends the plane's fuel and the player must either return to their base or perform an aerial refueling. To refuel mid-air, the player has to rendezvous with a refuelling plane at the specified coordinates and perform a probe and drogue refuelling manoeuvre.

The game ends in defeat if the player crashes, runs out of fuel, or is shot down by taking too much damage. The player can also eject, but can only do so safely over Allied territory. The player is victorious if they defeat all enemy forces. During the game, points are awarded and displayed in the control panel for destroyed enemies and tallied up when the game ends in a high score table.

== Development and release ==
ACE was developed by Cascade Games which was founded in 1983 by Guy Wilhelmy and Nigel Stevens. Wilhelmy had a pilot's license and had experience with aircraft control and responsiveness, while Stevens' father had been in the British Royal Air Force. Wilhelmy explained that he wanted to create a fast-paced flying game with responsive graphics which other games of the time struggled with. Cascade hired programmer Ian Martin and graphics designer Damon Redmond to work on the project in 1985. The first version known as A.C.E.: Air Combat Emulator was released in 1985 for the Commodore 16 and VIC-20 home computers. Martin describes that an advertisement erroneously promising a Plus/4 version forced them to develop it under threat of action by Advertising Standards Agency.

Martin recalled that afterwards the team had creative freedom to pursue different ideas for the planned Commodore 64 version, and after several months of development and a small delay, the C64 version called simply ACE was released in September 1985. The ZX Spectrum version followed the next year. An Amstrad CPC version was announced and Cascade Games promised a quick delivery with "speed and smoothness exceeding previous simulators". Having sold over half a million copies on 8-bit machines, the game's port was announced for Amiga. ComTec was tasked with porting the game to Amstrad PCW and Amiga. The game was marketed to America, and the C64 and Amiga versions were released and published in the US by UXB in 1986.

Before the release of ACE, Cascade Games was infamous for their Cassette 50 (1983) game compilation that featured simplistic and subpar games. Stevens pointed out that without the income from the compilation, the project would not have been possible. The developers estimated the production cost of ACE at £40k. Following the release of ACE, Cascade moved into mainstream AAA game development. Wilhelmy said that Cascade boasted over a million GBP in turnover over the following years. The company produced two sequels, ACE 2 (1987) and ACE 2088 (1989), and various other games before closing down in 1990.

== Reception ==
Main release (C64 and ZX) scores

Review scores
Publication	Score
Crash	81%
Computer and Video Games	8.5/10
Sinclair User	5/5
Your Sinclair	8/10
Zzap!64	90%
Computer Gamer	4/5

The first version for C16 and Plus/4 received positive reviews. Commodore Horizons awarded 8 stars to gameplay, describing it is "as good as anything" within the C16's limitations. Commodore User noted the C16 version for fast, but involved action. Their review of Plus/4 described it similarly, and called it one of the best dedicated Plus/4 games, only giving sound a lower score. Computer Gamer gave both the C16 and Plus/4 version 5 out of 5 stars and described ACE as easy to use and understand. They later noted the Plus/4 version was the best yet among available platforms. Your Commodore criticized the Plus/4 version for poor innovation, but scored it highly on gameplay and graphics, describing them as "realistic".

The expanded C64 and ZX Spectrum versions received the highest critic attention and praise on release. Zzap!64 rated ACE 90% and described it as the most exciting flight simulator on C64 to date. They noted good instruction, many available options, and easy controls. Computer and Video Games rated C64 version very positively, awarding gameplay 9/10 points, calling it the new title for the best of flight simulators. They described it as very well presented with a clear layout. Commodore User lauded ACE for having found the right balance between simulation and action. Crash rated it 81%, criticizing the quiet sound and calling out the graphics and overall quality as average for the genre. Sinclair User awarded the game 5/5 stars and praised the intentionally accessible gameplay as the high point. They felt the environment graphics were not great, while important objects and effects stood out well. Your Sinclair gave the game 8/10, noting it as unrealistic for a simulator, but easy to get into and addictive. Your Computer gave ACE 4/5 points, calling it a simulation that would appeal to arcade players, but they gave the sound 1/5 points. ZX Computing review labeled it a "monster hit" and called it a quality flying experience praising good sound, excellent graphics with the use of a horizon line, and well-defined objects. Compute!'s Gazette praised the game's speed, "amazing" graphics, and ease of play, concluding that players would "find this game consuming many hours without becoming a bore".

Several reviewers regarded ACE as one of the best available flight simulators of the time. Overall, the critics agreed that the game's arcade-like gameplay was easy to get into and play, but ultimately difficult to master and challenging to finish. Reviewers also negatively remarked upon the inclusion of Lenslok copy protection system where the game would display a garbled image and the player would need to use the provided lens to view the two-letter code. ZX Computing and Computer Gamer reviewers had trouble getting it to work and pass. Retro Gamer called it "notorious Lenslok" in retrospect.

Computer Gamer gave the Amstrad version 85%, praising the gameplay and graphics. They noted that it was an approachable flight simulator which can be played without reading the manual. Amstrad Action rated this version at 54%, calling it challenging, but lacking in action. They described the environmental detail and the fighting as high points, but criticized the sound as poor and the graphics as slow.

The game was later sold at bargain prices, bundled with ACE 2 and received several retrospect reviews. Commodore User rated the C64 bargain game 8/10, comparing it more to an aerial combat simulator than just a flight simulator. They noted plenty of gameplay and some simulation to keep the player occupied. Computer and Video Games awarded the game 90% for C64 and 87% for the Spectrum version, praising the game and describing it as an "essential purchase". Zzap!64 gave the game 67% and felt that, while the original reviewer's opinions held true, it did not stand up to time, with graphics being tacky and sparse and having programming issues. Commodore Force later gave the game 57% and noted, although receiving praise during release, its lacking gameplay did not age well. On the other hand, Commodore Format gave the game 3/4 points and lauded it even by 1991's standards. While they mentioned its simplicity, they also noted good graphics, fast-paced gameplay with superb dogfights and basic simulation. Commodore Format rated the ACE and ACE 2 bundle at 89%, calling it an "indisputable bargain". They praised the fast and uncluttered gameplay with simple objectives, while remarking that the graphics were not the best. Your Commodore rated the bundle 87/100, describing it as closer to arcade games rather than flight simulators and concluding that they were good games "with a few bugs".
