= UOP =

UOP is an initialism that may stand for the following:

- Ukroboronprom, a Ukrainian defence company
- University of Ottawa Press, publishing house
- University of Patras, in Patras, Greece
- University of Peloponnese, recently founded in Tripoli, Greece
- University of Pennsylvania, an Ivy League college in Philadelphia, Pennsylvania
- University of Peradeniya in Sri Lanka
- University of Peshawar, in Peshawar, Pakistan
- University of Petra, in Amman, Jordan
- University of Phoenix, for-profit educational institution specializing in adult education with online and ground classes
- University of Plymouth, in South Devon, England
- University of Portsmouth, in Hampshire
- University of Pretoria, South Africa
- University of Pune in India
- University of the Pacific (United States), in Stockton, California
- University of the Pacific (Peru), in Peru
- Honeywell UOP, formerly Universal Oil Products, a company developing and delivering oil-related technology to the major manufacturing industries
- Uranus Orbiter and Probe, a proposal to study Uranus and its moons
- Urząd Ochrony Państwa, Polish Intelligence agency
- User operation prohibition, function in commercial DVDs that prohibits user operation at certain times during playback (such as while a copyright notice is displayed)
- uop can be a way to spell μop or Micro-operation in computing, using a u to represent the Greek letter mu
