= WinX DVD Ripper Platinum =

- Developer: Digiarty Software
- Stable release: 8.9.2 / Jun-20-2019
- Operating system: Microsoft Windows
- Size: 31.4 MB
- Available in: English, Japanese, Chinese, German, French, Spanish, Portuguese, Italian, Danish, Norwegian
- Type: DVD ripper, Transcoder
- License: Shareware
- Website: www.winxdvd.com/dvd-ripper-platinum

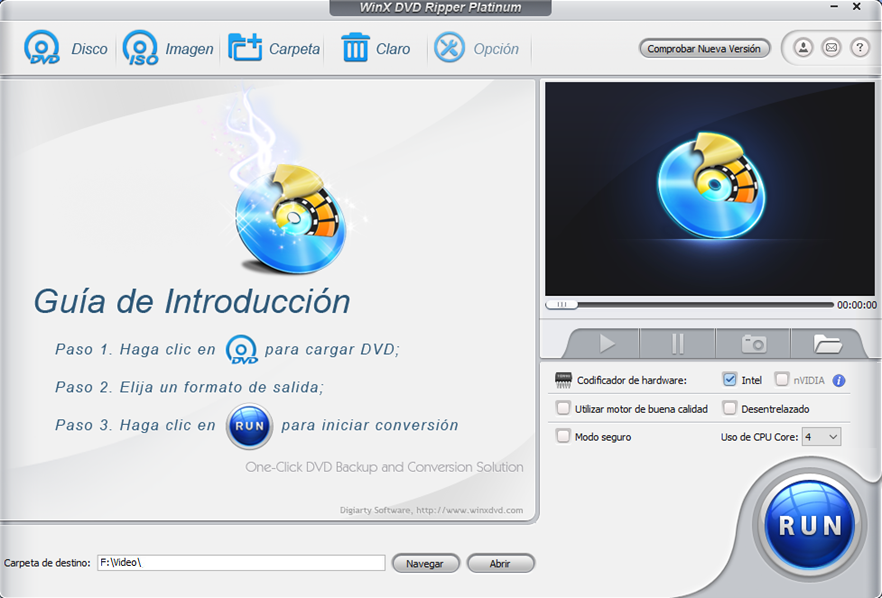
A screenshot of the program.

WinX DVD Ripper Platinum is a Windows-based DVD ripping program for copying and transcoding DVD discs, disc images or simple file copies from a DVD.

Conversion is possible into multiple common video/audio formats and it is also capable of removing DVD copy protection. It is developed by Digiarty Software Inc.

== See also ==
- DVD ripper
- Blu-ray ripper
- Comparison of video converters
- Comparison of DVD ripper software
