= Lenslok =

Copy protection mechanism

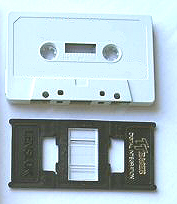
Lenslok prism and audio cassette

Lenslok is a copy protection mechanism found in some computer games and other software on the Atari 8-bit computers, Commodore 64, ZX Spectrum, Sinclair QL, MSX and Amstrad CPC. It was created by John Frost, an inventor and electronics consultant, and marketed by ASAP Developments, a subsidiary of J Rothschild Holdings. The first game to use it was Elite for the ZX Spectrum.

== Overview ==
Lenslok was released in 1985 as a plastic lens in a foldaway frame. The Lenslok device was essentially a row of prisms arranged vertically in a plastic holder. Before the game started, a two-letter code was displayed on the screen, but it was corrupted by being split into vertical bands which were then rearranged on screen. By viewing these bands through the Lenslok they were restored to their correct order and the code could be read and entered allowing access to the game. The device was small enough when folded flat to fit next to an audio cassette in a standard case.

In order for the Lenslok to work correctly the displayed image has to be the correct size. This meant that before each use the software needed to be calibrated to take account of the size of the display. Users found this setup particularly annoying, at least in part because they found the instructions that were initially shipped unclear. Additionally, the device could not be calibrated at all for very large and very small televisions, and some games shipped with mismatched Lensloks that prevented the code from being correctly descrambled. The Lenslok system was not used in later releases of Elite.

== Software ==
Lenslok was used on the following releases:

- ACE, released by Cascade Games
- Elite, released by Firebird
- The Advanced Music System, released by Firebird
- Fighter Pilot, released by Digital Integration
- Graphic Adventure Creator, released by Incentive Software
- Jewels of Darkness, released by Rainbird
- Moon Cresta, released by Incentive Software
- OCP Art Studio, released by Rainbird
- The Price of Magik, released by Level 9 Computing
- Supercharge, released by Digital Precision
- Tomahawk, released by Digital Integration
- TT Racer, released by Digital Integration

== See also ==
- Product key
