= DVD region code =

Characteristic of DVDs

DVD regions

DVD region codes are a digital rights management technique introduced in 1997. It is designed to allow rights holders to control the international distribution of a DVD release, including its content, release date, and price, all according to the appropriate region.

This is achieved by way of region-locked DVD players, which will play back only DVDs encoded to their region (plus those without any region code). The American DVD Copy Control Association also requires that DVD player manufacturers incorporate the Regional Playback Control (RPC) system. However, region-free DVD players, which ignore region coding, are also commercially available, and many DVD players can be modified to be region-free, allowing playback of all discs.

DVDs may use one code, multiple codes (multi-region), or all codes (region free).

== Region codes and countries ==
DVD region codes and geographic scope
Region code	Area
0 / ALL	Worldwide. These discs have all region-1-through-8 flags set, allowing the discs to be played in all regions.
1	United States (incl. Puerto Rico), Canada, and Bermuda
2	Europe (except Belarus, Russia, and Ukraine), Greenland, British Overseas Territories, Overseas France, Middle East, Eswatini, Lesotho, South Africa, and Japan
3	Southeast Asia, South Korea, Taiwan, Hong Kong, and Macau
4	Latin America, Australia, Caribbean, (except French Guiana, Puerto Rico, and the French West Indies), and Oceania (except French Polynesia, New Caledonia, Wallis and Futuna, and Hawaii)
5	Africa (except Egypt, Lesotho, Eswatini, South Africa, Mayotte and Réunion), Russia, Belarus, Ukraine, Central Asia, South Asia, Mongolia, and North Korea
6	Mainland China
7	MPA-related DVDs and "media copies" of pre-releases in Asia
8	International venues such as aircraft, cruise ships, and spacecraft

Any combination of regions can be applied to a single disc. For example, a DVD designated Region 2/4 is suitable for playback in Europe, Latin America, Oceania, and any other Region 2 or Region 4 area. So-called "Region 0" and "ALL" discs are meant to be playable worldwide. The term "Region 0" also describes the DVD players designed or modified to incorporate Regions 1–8, thereby providing compatibility with most discs, regardless of region. This apparent solution was popular in the early days of the DVD format, but studios quickly responded by adjusting discs to refuse to play in such machines by implementing a system known as "Regional Coding Enhancement" (RCE).

DVDs sold in the Baltic states use both region 2 and 5 codes, having previously been in region 5 (because of their history as part of the USSR), but EU single market law concerning the free movement of goods caused a switch to region 2. European region 2 DVDs may be sub-coded "D1" to "D4". "D1" are the UK only releases; "D2" and "D3" are not sold in the UK and Ireland; "D4" are distributed throughout Europe. Overseas territories of the United Kingdom and France (both in region 2) often have other regions (4 or 5, depending on geographical situation) than their homelands.

Most DVDs sold in Mexico and the rest of Latin America carry both region 1 and 4 codes. Some made after 2006 are region 1 to coincide with Blu-ray region A.

Egypt, Eswatini, Lesotho, and South Africa are in DVD region 2, while all other African countries are in region 5, but all African countries are in the same Blu-ray region code (region B).

North Korea and South Korea have different DVD region codes (North Korea: region 5, South Korea: region 3), but use the same Blu-ray region code (region A). In China, two DVD region codes are used: Mainland China uses region 6, but Hong Kong and Macau use region 3. There are also two Blu-ray regions used: China uses region C, while Hong Kong and Macau use region A. Most DVDs in India combine the region 2, region 4, and region 5 codes, or are region 0.

== Region-code enhanced ==
Region-code enhanced, also known as just "RCE" or "REA", was a retroactive attempt to prevent the playing of one region's discs in another region, even if the disc was played in a region-free player. The scheme was deployed on only a handful of discs. The disc contained the main program material region coded as region 1. But it also contained a short video loop of a map of the world showing the regions, which was coded as region 2, 3, 4, 5, and 6. The intention was that when the disc was played in a non-region 1 player, the player would default to playing the material for its native region. This played the aforementioned video loop of a map, which was impossible to escape from, as the user controls were disabled.

The scheme was fundamentally flawed, as a region-free player tries to play a disc using the last region that worked with the previously inserted disc. If it cannot play the disc, then it tries another region until one is found that works. RCE could be defeated by briefly playing a "normal" region 1 disc, and then inserting the RCE protected region 1 disc, which would now play. RCE also caused a few problems with genuine region 1 players.

Many "multi-region" DVD players defeated regional lockout and RCE by automatically identifying and matching a disc's region code or allowing the user to manually select a particular region. Some manufacturers of DVD players now freely supply information on how to disable regional lockout, and on some recent models, it appears to be disabled by default. Many DVD rippers can also circumvent RCE restrictions (see Circumvention).

== Purpose ==
One purpose of region coding is controlling release dates. One practice of movie marketing which was threatened by the advent of digital home video was the tradition of releasing a movie to cinemas and then for general rental or sale later in some countries than in others. This practice was historically common because before the advent of digital cinema, releasing a movie at the same time worldwide used to be prohibitively expensive. Most importantly, manufacturing a release print of a film for public exhibition in a cinema has always been expensive, but a large number of release prints are needed only for a narrow window of time during the first few weeks after a film's release. Spreading out release dates allows for reuse of some release prints in other regions. For example, the film 28 Days Later was available on DVD in the United Kingdom before it was released in theaters in the United States.

Videotapes were inherently regional since formats had to match those of the encoding system used by television stations in that particular region, such as NTSC and PAL, although from the early 1990s PAL machines increasingly offered NTSC playback. DVDs are less restricted in that sense. Region coding allows movie studios to better control the global release dates of DVDs.

Also, the copyright in a title may be held by different entities in different territories. Region coding enables copyright holders to (attempt to) prevent a DVD from a region from which they do not derive royalties from being played on a DVD player inside their region. Region coding attempts to dissuade importing of DVDs from one region into another.

=== PAL/SECAM vs. NTSC ===
DVDs are also formatted for use on two distinct regional television systems: 480i/60 Hz and 576i/50 Hz (in analog contexts referred to as 525/60 NTSC) and 625/50 PAL/SECAM). Strictly speaking, analog color television signal formats do not apply to the digital domain, but the DVD system was originally designed to encode the information necessary to reproduce signals in these formats, and the terms continue to be used to identify refresh rates and vertical resolution. However, an "NTSC", "PAL", or "SECAM" DVD player that has one or more analog composite video output will only produce the corresponding signals from those outputs, and may only play DVDs identified with the corresponding format.

NTSC is the analog TV format historically associated with the United States, Canada, Japan, South Korea, Mexico, Philippines, Taiwan, and other countries. PAL is the analog color TV format historically associated with most of Europe, most of Africa, China, India, Australia, New Zealand, Israel, North Korea, and other countries (Brazil adopted the variant PAL-M, which uses the refresh rate and resolution commonly associated with NTSC). SECAM, a format associated with French-speaking Europe, while using the same resolution and refresh rate as PAL, is a distinct format which uses a very different system of color encoding. Some DVD players can only play discs identified as NTSC, PAL or SECAM, while others can play multiple standards.

In general, it is easier for consumers in PAL/SECAM countries to view NTSC DVDs than vice versa. Almost all DVD players sold in PAL/SECAM countries are capable of playing both kinds of discs, and most modern PAL TVs can handle the converted signal. NTSC discs may be output from a PAL DVD player in three different ways:

- using a non-chroma encoded format such as RGB SCART or YP_{B}P_{R} component video.
- using PAL 60 encoded composite video/S-Video—a "hybrid" system which uses NTSC's 525/60 line format along with PAL's chroma subcarrier
- using NTSC encoded composite video/S-Video.

However, most NTSC players cannot play PAL discs, and most NTSC TVs do not accept 576i video signals as used on PAL/SECAM DVDs. Those in NTSC countries, such as the United States, generally require both a region-free, multi-standard player and a multi-standard television to view PAL discs, or a converter box, whereas those in PAL countries generally require only a region-free player to view NTSC discs (with the possible exception of Japanese discs in most European countries, since they are in the same region - this means European region 2 users could import Japanese discs and play them on their players without any obstacles.) There are also differences in pixel aspect ratio (720 × 480 vs. 720 × 576 with the same image aspect ratio) and display frame rate (29.97 vs. 25).

Most computer-based DVD software and hardware can play both NTSC and PAL video and both audio standards. Blu-ray players, which use up to 1080p signals, are backwards compatible with both NTSC and PAL DVDs.

== Implementations of region codes ==
=== Standalone DVD players ===
Usually, a configuration flag is set in each player's firmware at the factory. This flag holds the region number that the machine is allowed to play. Region-free players are DVD players shipped without the ability to enforce regional lockout (usually by means of a chip that ignores any region coding), or without this flag set.

However, if the player is not region-free, it can often be unlocked with an unlock code entered via the remote control. This code simply allows the user to change the factory-set configuration flag to another region, or to the special region "0". Once unlocked this way, the DVD player allows the owner to watch DVDs from any region. Many websites exist on the Internet offering these codes, often known informally as hacks. Many websites provide instructions for different models of standalone DVD players, to hack, and their factory codes.

=== Computer DVD drives ===
Older DVD drives use RPC-1 (Regional Playback Control) firmware, which means the drive allows DVDs from any region to play. Newer drives use RPC-2 firmware, which enforces the DVD region coding at the hardware level. These drives can often be reflashed or hacked with RPC-1 firmware, effectively making the drive region-free. This may void the drive's warranty.

Some drives may come set as region-free, so the user is expected to assign their region when they buy it. In this case, some DVD programs may prompt the user to select a region, while others may actually assign the region automatically based on the locale set in the operating system.

In most computer drives, users are allowed to change the region code up to five times. If the number of allowances reaches zero, the region last used will be permanent even if the drive is transferred to another computer. This limit is built into the drive's controller software, called firmware. Resetting the firmware count can be done with first- or third-party software tools, or by reflashing (see above) to RPC-1 firmware.

Since some software does not work correctly with RPC-1 drives, there is also the option of reflashing the drive with a so-called auto-reset firmware. This firmware appears as RPC-2 firmware to software, but will reset the region changes counter whenever power is cycled, reverting to the state of a drive that has never had its region code changed.

=== Software DVD players ===
Most freeware and open source DVD players ignore region coding. VLC, for example, does not attempt to enforce region coding; however, it requires access to the DVD's raw data to overcome CSS encryption, and such access may not be available on some drives with RPC-2 firmware when playing a disc from a different region than the region to which the drive is locked. Most commercial players are locked to a region code, but can be easily changed with software.

Other software, known as DVD region killers, transparently remove (or hide) the DVD region code from the software player. Some can also work around locked RPC-2 firmware.

=== Video game consoles ===
The Xbox, Xbox 360, PlayStation 2 and PlayStation 3 consoles are all region-locked for DVD playback. The PlayStation 2 can be modified to have its regional-locking disabled through the use of modchips. Although region locked on film DVDs and film Blu-ray Discs, the PlayStation 3, PlayStation 4, PlayStation 5, Xbox One, and Xbox Series X are region free for video games, though add-on content on the online store is region locked and must match the region of the disc.

== Circumvention ==
Many DVD ripper apps can make copies of DVDs with region coding and RCE protection removed. Copied discs can then be played on standard DVD players or on a computer with media player software. Other software can remove region codes, RCE, and other protections transparently in the background, allowing media player software to directly play discs from any region without copying them first. Many DVD rippers can also circumvent several other types of digital rights management (DRM) and copy protection, such as Content Scramble System (CSS), Macrovision Analog Protection System, and User Operation Prohibitions (UOPs).

In common region-locked DVDs (but not in RCE-DVDs), the region code is stored in the file "VIDEO_TS.IFO" (table "VMGM_MAT"), byte offsets 34 and 35. The eight regions each correspond to a value which is a power of 2: Region 1 corresponds to 1 (2^{0}), Region 2 to 2 (2^{1}), Region 3 to 4 (2^{2}), and so on through Region 8, which corresponds to 128 (2^{7}). The values of each region that the disc is not encoded for are added together to give the value in the file. For example, a disc that is encoded for Region 1 but not Regions 2–8 will have the value 2+4+8+16+32+64+128=254. A disc encoded for Regions 1, 2 and 4 will have the value 4+16+32+64+128=244. A region-free or RCE-protected DVD will carry the value zero, since no regions are excluded.

== Blu-ray disc region codes ==
Blu-ray regions

Blu-ray discs use a much simpler region-code system than DVD with only three regions, labeled A, B and C. As with DVDs, many Blu-rays are encoded region 0 (region free), making them suitable for players worldwide.

Region code	Area
A/1	The Americas and their dependencies, Taiwan, Japan, Hong Kong, Macau, Korea, and Southeast Asia
B/2	Africa, West Asia, most of Europe, Australia, New Zealand, and their dependencies
C/3	Central Asia, China, Mongolia, South Asia, Belarus, Ukraine, Russia, Kazakhstan, Moldova, and their dependencies
ABC/FREE	Worldwide. Region free is not an official setting; discs that bear the region FREE symbol either have no flags set or have all three flags set.

Unlike DVD region codes, Blu-ray regions are verified only by the player software, not by the computer system or the drive. The region code is stored in a file or the registry, and there are hacks to reset the region counter of the player software. In standalone Blu-ray players, the region code is part of and enforced by the firmware.

Similar to DVDs, some Blu-ray rippers (such as AnyDVD HD) can remove region codes as well as other types of digital rights management (DRM) and copy protection, including Advanced Access Content System (AACS) and BD+. Multi-regional standalone players available, and some standalone Blu-ray players can be modified to be region-free.

A new form of Blu-ray region coding tests not only the region of the player/player software, but also its country code. This means, for example, while both the US and Japan are Region A, some American discs are not going to be played on devices/software installed in Japan or vice versa, due to the two countries having different country codes (the United States has 21843 or Hex 5553 ("US" in ASCII, according to ISO 3166-1), and Japan has 19024, or Hex 4a50 ("JP"); Canada has 17217 or Hex 4341 ("CA"). Although there are only three Blu-ray regions, the country code allows much more precise control of the regional distribution of Blu-ray discs than the six (or eight) DVD regions. In Blu-ray discs, there are not any "special regions" like the regions 7 and 8 in DVDs.

Ultra HD Blu-ray discs are region-free as they're generally encoded as worldwide region.

== UMD region codes ==
For the UMD, a disc type used for the PlayStation Portable, UMD movies have region codes similar to DVDs, although many PSP games are region-free.

- Region 0: Any disc is played worldwide.
- Region 1: Any disc is played in North and Central America.
- Region 2: Any disc is played in Europe, Japan, Middle East, South Africa, and Greenland.
- Region 3: Any disc is played in Southeast Asia, Taiwan, South Korea, and Hong Kong.
- Region 4: Any disc is played in Oceania and South America.
- Region 5: Any disc is played in Russia, Ukraine, Belarus, India, Pakistan, Africa (without Egypt or South Africa), North Korea, and Mongolia.
- Region 6: Any disc is played in China.

== Criticism and legal concerns ==
Region coding was criticized for facilitating unlawful market control strategies, such as price fixing. Sale of region-coded DVDs is illegal in New Zealand.

=== Oceania ===
The Australian Competition & Consumer Commission (ACCC) has warned that DVD players that enforce region-coding may violate the Competition and Consumer Act 2010. A December 2000 report from the ACCC advised consumers to "exercise caution when purchasing a DVD video player because of the restrictions that limit their ability to play imported DVDs." The report stated, "These restrictions are artificially imposed by a group of multinational film entertainment companies and are not caused by the existing differences in television display formats such as PAL, NTSC and SECAM [...] The ACCC is currently investigating whether Australian consumers are paying higher prices for DVDs because of the ability of copyright owners, such as film companies, to prevent competition by restricting imports from countries where the same (authorised) video titles are sold more cheaply." In 2012, a report from the Sydney Morning Herald revealed that region-free DVD players were legal in Australia, as they were exempt from the Technological Protection Measures (TPMs) included in the US Free Trade Agreement. Under New Zealand copyright law, DVD region codes and the mechanisms in DVD players to enforce them have no legal protection.

=== Europe ===
The practice was also criticized by the European Commission which as of 14 March 2001 were investigating whether the resulting price discrimination amounts to a violation of European competition law.

=== North America ===
The Washington Post highlighted how DVD region-coding was a major inconvenience for travelers who have the desire to legally purchase DVDs worldwide and return with them to their countries of origin, students of foreign languages, immigrants who want to watch films from their country of origin, and foreign film fans. Another criticism is that region-coding allows for local censorship, such as the Region 1 DVD of the 1999 drama film Eyes Wide Shut which contains the digital manipulations needed for the film to secure an MPAA R-rating, while these manipulations are not evident in discs that are not in region 1.

== See also ==
- Broadcast television systems
- DVD Copy Control Association
- Geo-blocking
- Regional lockout
