= ACE 2 (video game) =

1987 video game

Ace 2
- Developer: Cascade Games
- Publishers: UK: Cascade Games; NA: Artronic Limited
- Designer: Ian Martin
- Programmers: James Byrne; Nick Fitzsimons; Roger Taylor
- Artists: James Hartshorn; Damon Redmond
- Platforms: Plus/4, Commodore 64, ZX Spectrum, Amstrad CPC, MS-DOS
- Release: UK: 1987; NA: 1987
- Genre: Combat flight simulator
- Modes: Single player, multiplayer

ACE 2 (an acronym for Air Combat Emulator 2) is a combat flight simulation game developed by Cascade Games. It was published in 1987 for the Commodore 64, Plus/4, ZX Spectrum, Amstrad CPC, and MS-DOS. The game is a sequel to Ace. The player takes the role of a fighter jet pilot on modern day missions in the Middle East. The display shows the plane's instrumentation and cockpit view. Reviews were mixed, with critics praising the new control scheme and introduction of multiplayer. Others criticized it for being oversimplified compared to its predecessor.

== Gameplay ==
Compared to its predecessor, the game is much more simplified in terms of controls and is now largely focused on dogfighting between two enemy jet fighters. While being optimized for two players, it also supports singleplayer play against an AI controlled jet.

Flight controls were simplified to just the joystick and pressing the keyboard to increase or decrease the throttle. A map of the area can be called up at any time, showing the position of the player and the enemy.

== Reception ==
Reception

Review scores
Publication	Score
Computer and Video Games	80%
The Games Machine	83%
ZZap!64	81%

The Games Machine said that it was "an excellent two-player head-to-head combat game", and calling it "very fast, very playable, and, more often than not, very tense".

ZZap!64 called the game "fun" despite being "oversimplified", and saying it was a "good game in its own right" despite the fact that fans of the original might be disappointed.

Computer and Video Games said "the fiddly controls are kept to a bare minimum".
