= Reloaded (warez) =

Warez group founded in June 2004

Reloaded (stylised as RELOADED and RLD) is a warez group founded in June 2004 from the ex-members of DEViANCE. They released and cracked Spore 4 days before its release date and a beta version of The Sims 3 15 days before its release date. On February 29, 2008, Reloaded released a cracked version of Assassin's Creed, a month before its release on March 28. However, this release was later nuked for not being the final retail version as well as having crashing issues. The retail version was released by them more than a month later.

== Timeline ==
On May 26, 2006, Reloaded released the StarForce protected game Tom Clancy's Splinter Cell: Chaos Theory. This cracked release became available 424 days after its official release date.

On February 27, 2010, Reloaded released Battlefield: Bad Company 2 three days before release date, but players reported problems with the game controls.

Many keygens made by Reloaded generate keys ending in RLD.

Reloaded decided to release an old internal tool to the public when Macrovision became Rovi Corporation and discontinued the development of SafeDisc and SafeCast DRMs. It can be used to bypass checks like CD/DVD validation, trial, online activation (for beta games), execution-count and of silent CD/DVD checks.

Ubisoft used a cracked exe from Reloaded for the PC game Tom Clancy's Rainbow Six: Vegas 2 after a new patch broke legally downloaded versions of the game.

On March 5, 2012, Reloaded released a cracked version of Mass Effect 3 the day before its official release. An incomplete uncracked version was already available on February 14.

On October 29, 2013, RELOADED released a cracked version of Battlefield 4 on the day of its release.

On May 26, 2014, RELOADED released a cracked version of Ubisoft's much-anticipated open-world hacking game, Watch Dogs, the day before its official release on May 27. The group released a cracked version of Far Cry 4 days before its release date that was on 18 November 2014 because they acquired the game on 11 November due to a leak by the German Amazon.com.
