= StarForce =

Russian software developer

- Type: Copy protection
- Website: www.star-force.com

StarForce Technologies (previously known as Protection Technology) is a Russian software developer with headquarters in Moscow. Its main activities are information security, protection against unauthorized copying, modification, and analysis (decompilation).

== Protection options ==
StarForce Technologies provides multiple protection options for protecting digital information, such as anti-cheat solutions, C++ obfuscation, generation of cryptographic obfuscation, optical disc DRM, limited activation number per machine/optical disk drive, audio and video files, and protection for digital media such as images and documents. The relevant protection brands are Audio/Video, C++ Obfuscator, Crypto, Content, Disc, E-m@il, MMOG, ProActive (additional versions for businesses and traders), and Universal.

== Security ==
When StarForce 3.0 was released, it initially provided extremely strong protection – the StarForce 3.0-protected game Splinter Cell: Chaos Theory was uncracked for 422 days. It also marked a significant step up in the effort required to reverse engineer it.

In March 2006 the warez group RELOADED released a vast array of documentation about how StarForce 3 works. Alongside many technical details, it revealed how several resource-intensive procedures were implemented, such as virtual file system and functions protected within a complex virtual machine.

=== Driver installation ===
StarForce 3.0 has received criticism for installing its own device driver onto computers along with the protected product, which is generally not uninstalled along with the software (Peter Jackson's King Kong being one exception). Colin McRae: DIRT, however, both asks the player for permission to install the drivers and includes a help file with information on how to remove them.

==== Lite ====
StarForce 3.0 drivers are installed with certain older game demos, freeware, and downloadable games, like TrackMania Nations. Their presence is intended to prevent crackers from using demo executables to help break retail executables (as the two will usually be quite similar).

==== Driverless ====
Currently (May 2014) the use of StarForce solutions became much easier for end users due to "driverless" security technology and binding to a computer. The company also is developing cloud services to protect content and e-mail that are designed to simplify the process of information protection used in everyday life.

=== Clients ===
StarForce's customers include Russian Railways, Corel, 1C, Mail.ru, Aeroflot, SUN InBev Russia, AMD, ATC International, MediaHouse, Russobit-M, New Disc, Buka, Snowball, 2Play, GFI, Cenega and Akella.

=== Community response ===
Some gamers have advocated boycotts of games or publishers known to use StarForce. These gamers claim that StarForce software causes system instability and crashes and that Protection Technology refuses to address the damage their software causes. In 2006, a $5 million lawsuit was filed against Ubisoft for using StarForce in their games on the allegations that StarForce compromises PC security, slows down PCs, causes crashes, and even damages optical drives. However, the case was dropped two years later due to lack of evidence.

Ubisoft decided to investigate the extent of the StarForce boycott and ran a poll on their forums, the outcome of which was against the use of StarForce. As a result, (along with general discontent on the web), in Heroes of Might and Magic V and GTR2, StarForce 3.0 was replaced by SecuROM.

== Removal of StarForce drivers ==
Uninstalling a StarForce-protected game does not remove the StarForce driver from the system. The StarForce SDK provides functions for implementors to remove the driver during uninstall of the game, but this is not automatically carried out. An official utility program exists to remove the StarForce driver from the system. The program is hosted at a third-party website with a link on the official StarForce website. Instructions for manual removal have also been provided by the community.

Starting from StarForce 4.0 it includes a removal service. This service automatically uninstalls StarForce drivers after a StarForce-protected product is uninstalled. After the drivers are uninstalled, the service uninstalls itself as well.

== Controversy ==
On January 1, 2006, Boing Boing claimed that StarForce was malware, mentioning several problems claimed to be associated with the protection system, including disk drive performance degradation and weakening of operating system security and stability. Tweakguides subsequently countered Boing Boing's claim, stating that there is no evidence of StarForce doing anything harmful.

On March 5, 2006, a StarForce employee publicly posted a working link to a BitTorrent search engine listing of Galactic Civilizations II torrents during a discussion about the popularity of the game. Their action was publicized on various websites, including Digg, Neowin, and Penny Arcade. Stardock also posted an article, partially in response to inaccurate reporting of their own reasons for releasing the game without copy protection. StarForce later closed the thread, posting an apology and stating that the employee "just wanted to show that every non-protected game can be cracked".
