= Tom Clancy's Rainbow Six: Vegas 2 =

2008 video game

- Developer: Ubisoft Montreal
- Publisher: Ubisoft
- Director: Maxime Béland
- Composer: Paul Haslinger
- Series: Tom Clancy's Rainbow Six
- Engine: Unreal Engine 3
- Platforms: PlayStation 3, Xbox 360, Microsoft Windows
- Release: PlayStation 3, Xbox 360: NA: March 18, 2008; PAL: March 20, 2008; Microsoft Windows: NA: April 15, 2008; PAL: April 17, 2008
- Genres: Tactical shooter, first-person shooter
- Modes: Single-player, multiplayer

Tom Clancy's Rainbow Six: Vegas 2 is the sixth main installment in the Rainbow Six series. It is a first-person shooter video game and the sequel to Tom Clancy's Rainbow Six: Vegas. It was announced by Ubisoft on November 20, 2007. The game was released for the Xbox 360 and PlayStation 3 in March 2008. The Microsoft Windows version, however, was delayed until April 2008. It was released in Japan on April 24, 2008, for the Xbox 360 and on May 29, 2008, for the PlayStation 3. This game is also available for Xbox One and Xbox Series X/S via backward compatibility.

Logan Keller, the lead character from the previous game, had been removed in favour of having the player create their own character to play through the campaign. The player assumes the role of Bishop, a member of the Rainbow squad with a great deal more experience who has a deeper involvement in the story. Co-op players assume the role of Bishop's teammate Knight. The game, billed as "part sequel, part prequel", has events that run both before and concurrently to the story of Logan Keller and continue after where the first game concluded. In addition to the ability to customize a character in multiplayer, the player can now customize Bishop, Vegas 2's protagonist. In single-player, the developers claim to have vastly improved teammate AI, so that now teammates can cover each other as they advance. There are also several new commands, for example, the ability of a teammate to throw a grenade at a specific point. It is also possible to give commands to one's AI teammates using the Xbox 360, Xbox One, or PlayStation 3 headset, or a PC microphone.

== Gameplay ==
=== Characters ===
Bishop is the main protagonist that the player controls throughout Rainbow Six: Vegas 2. His appearance will vary depending on the player's choices. If co-op mode is enabled, Knight, whose appearance also varies based on player decision, accompanies Bishop on missions. Knight's role, however, is limited as merely a co-op player, and Knight is not present in the single player campaign's story. Playing as Knight also allows co-op achievements to be unlocked.

=== Single-player ===
Rainbow Six: Vegas 2 includes a single-player campaign/storyline mode as well as a variation of the Terrorist Hunt mode included in previous games, which involves repeated encounters with enemy AI terrorists in a non-linear map.

Terrorist Hunt mode may be played in alone or with a pair of computer-controlled allies that may be issued environment-based contextual commands. Both the campaign and Terrorist Hunt game modes support cooperative multiplayer which can have up to three players. Present in all game modes is a multi-dimensional advancement system.

The game enters a third-person perspective when the player takes cover behind a wall or piece of the environment. While in third-person mode, the player can shoot enemies blindly or aim using the reticle, without the ability to look directly into their weapons aiming sights, unless a scope is attached.

=== Multiplayer ===
The multiplayer in Vegas 2 has been expanded to include more than 10 new close-quarters maps, two new adversarial modes, a newer and different rewards system, and according to Ubisoft, improved online matchmaking. Another feature for multiplayer is that using an Xbox Live Vision camera or a PlayStation Eye, the player could take a picture of their face and make themselves the playable character. A camera can be used in the PC version to create a playable character. Ubisoft released downloadable content for Vegas 2, a fan pack that includes three maps from the Rainbow Six Vegas and new XP ranks. The servers for Rainbow Six: Vegas 2 were later discontinued in 2021.

=== Co-op ===
Up to four players can play together in co-op. Although Terrorist Hunt mode retains the four human player limit (online only), the story mode in Rainbow Six: Vegas 2 has reduced co-op from four players to two players, with the second player assuming the position of Knight, Bishop's teammate.

=== Advancement system ===
The experience point (XP) system is different from that in Rainbow Six: Vegas in that every kill achieved awards the player XP. XP gains result in promotions which reward the player with new equipment, such as body armor. Players also receive bonuses from the ACES combat system, a separate but related advancement system from the XP system. ACES advancement is based on the methods used to kill opponents, and weaponry unlocked differs depending on which tactics are used. Experience can be gained by the player in any game mode, single player or multiplayer, and advancement is shared amongst all modes. Equipment unlocked in one mode is usable in all other modes.

== Plot ==
In 2005, Bishop leads Rainbow operatives Logan Keller and Gabriel Nowak in a hostage rescue operation in the Pyrénées, where the hostage negotiator is killed due to Nowak's impulsiveness. After securing the hostages, Bishop and Keller cover Nowak as he defuses a bomb, but he is injured during an ambush shortly afterward. Alpha Team, led by Domingo "Ding" Chavez, eventually arrives to support Bishop, and Nowak is safely extracted.

Five years later, Bishop assumes command of Bravo Team, consisting of Mike Walter and Jung Park to investigate the Las Vegas area after the National Security Agency suspects two coyotes, Miguel and Alvarez Cabreros, of smuggling chemical weapons from Mexico into Las Vegas. As Bishop's team rush to the warehouse containing the weapons, they are delayed by a hostage situation which Bishop declares to be of top priority. While rescuing the hostages, the team is alerted that a van possibly containing explosives has fled. Furthermore, Bishop learns that in addition to a chemical bomb, a conventional explosive device is also present. The team manages to locate the chemical weapons van, but find it empty. They frantically search the area but reach the target, a Las Vegas recreational center and sports complex, too late, and all civilians inside are killed.

Immediately afterward, Bishop learns that Miguel has escaped the area, and Bravo Team manages to corner and interrogate him in the Neon Boneyard. At first, Miguel denies any knowledge of the bomb, but after the team threatens him, he reveals the location of the second bomb at the Las Vegas Convention Center. Bishop then kills Miguel in self defense after goading him into drawing his weapon.

The team head to the convention center and rescue its chief of security, who reveals that a second bomb is located on a monorail headed towards the Las Vegas Hilton hotel. The team fights their way to the bomb and disables its timer, but they are unable to disable the bomb's remote detonation circuitry in a timely manner. Thinking quickly, Bishop suggests Bravo Team detonate the bomb themselves in an unpopulated area after sending it to a safe distance by activating the train. Afterwards, Bishop is contacted by an NSA agent, who reveals that the terrorists have set up in a Las Vegas penthouse and are preparing another attack.

As Bravo Team nears the penthouse, a sniper shoots at their helicopter and injures intelligence agent Sharon Judd, despite assurances by the NSA agent of a safe landing zone; the team then proceeds to clear the building. After rappelling from the penthouse to the casino below, Bishop learns that there is a third bomb being held in a theatre; the team assaults the area and successfully defuses the bomb, saving several hostages in the process. Bravo Team then fights their way to the roof for extraction, while Mike and Jung are reassigned to assist Logan following his team's ambush in Mexico.

On the roof, the masked NSA agent joins Bishop in the helicopter, revealing that Alvarez has been spotted at an airstrip in the desert. Bishop and the NSA agent enter the area at separate locations, and Bishop fights through an oil refinery and abandoned trainyard in order to get to the airstrip. After reaching a hangar in the airstrip, Bishop discovers the NSA agent speaking with Alvarez; the agent is revealed to be Nowak, who then kills Alvarez. Nowak insults Bishop and reveals that he was the true mastermind behind the events, before his forces ambush Bishop. Bishop is then knocked unconscious by an explosion, but is dragged to safety by Bravo Team's pilot and reports to Chavez who orders Bishop to stand down.

Bishop, Keller, and Bravo Team, all defying orders to stand down, follow Nowak to a Costa Rican villa. As Bravo Team storms the complex, Nowak taunts Bishop and reveals that he intends to sell information about Rainbow operatives on the black market. Bishop closes in and attempts to face Nowak alone; however, an attack helicopter and reinforcements arrive. Bishop manages to force the helicopter into radioing for assistance, allowing a friendly SAM battery to triangulate its location and shoot it down. As Bishop confronts Nowak, he gloats, claiming that he has outsmarted all of Rainbow and argues that Bishop should have let him fix his own mistakes, while Bishop tries to calm him down and offers Nowak a chance to turn himself in. However, Nowak draws his weapon, forcing Bishop to shoot him dead as the rest of Bravo Team inspect the area. Bishop is berated by Chavez at first for disobeying orders, but is then offered a position as Deputy Director of Rainbow HQ in Hereford, England.

== Development ==
=== Limited edition ===
The limited edition for Tom Clancy's Rainbow Six: Vegas 2 was released on launch day. Differences between the regular and the limited edition include a collectible poker chip keychain, a bonus disc containing a strategy video, an interview with pro gamer FinestX, an MLG insider video containing hints and tips about the online modes, and a sneak peek into Tom Clancy's EndWar.

=== Anti-piracy ===
In July 2008, Ubisoft released the 1.02 version update patch. In addition to adding new weapons and maps, the update also secretly installed a disc check anti-piracy countermeasure. This would check whether or not a legally purchased disc copy of the game was inserted in the PC's disc drive and prevent the game from loading if it detected no disc. While this was not an issue for players who purchased a physical copy, the anti-piracy update inadvertently also carried over to the digital copies sold through IGN's Direct2Drive service, locking them out of the game. These problems were rectified with update version 1.03, where it was discovered that Ubisoft's patch solving the problem was a No-CD crack taken from Reloaded, a pirated games group, and re-released as an official patch.

== Reception ==
Reception

Aggregate scores
Aggregator	Score
GameRankings	(PS3) 83.56% (X360) 82.77% (PC) 78.39%
Metacritic	(X360) 82/100 (PS3) 81/100 (PC) 78/100

Review scores
Publication	Score
Edge	7/10
Eurogamer	7/10
Game Informer	9.25/10
GamePro	4/5
GameRevolution	(X360) B− (PS3) C+
GameSpot	8.5/10 (PC) 7/10
GameSpy	4.5/5
GameTrailers	8.5/10
GameZone	(X360) 9/10 (PS3) 8.9/10 (PC) 7.5/10
Giant Bomb	4/5
IGN	(X360, AU) 8.5/10 (X360 [US] & PS3 [Limited Edition]) 8.4/10 (PS3) 8.2/10 (X360, UK) 8/10 (PC) 7.7/10
Official Xbox Magazine (US)	8/10
PC Gamer (US)	77%

The game received generally positive reviews from critics. GameRankings and Metacritic gave it a score of 83.56% and 81 out of 100 for the PlayStation 3 version; 82.77% and 82 out of 100 for the Xbox 360 version; and 78.39% and 78 out of 100 for the PC version.

In the April 2008 issue of Game Informer Tom Clancy's Rainbow Six: Vegas 2 was given a review of 9.25 out of 10. IGN gave the Xbox 360 version an 8.4 out of 10 and the PlayStation 3 version an 8.2 for the original version, and an 8.4 for its Limited Edition, where the main criticism was that the game was too similar to the first, and citing slight frame-rate issues on the PS3 version. TeamXbox gave the game a score of 8.4 out of ten and said it was "definitely worth a look-see, but don't expect much more excitement than the first time you plopped Lockdown into that fat, black console."
