= CD and DVD copy protection =

Measures to thwart copying of disc-based media

Symbol indicates that a disc is copy protected

CD/DVD copy protection is a blanket term for various methods of copy protection for CDs and DVDs. Such methods include DRM, CD-checks, dummy files, illegal tables of contents, over-sizing or over-burning the CD, physical errors and bad sectors. Many protection schemes rely on breaking compliance with CD and DVD standards, leading to playback problems on some devices.

During the development of the DVD, also copy-protection measures were debated to prevent illicit copies from being made from either the analog or digital I/O channels of DVD recorders. The digital transmission of content is protected by an encryption protocol between two communicating devices and content on the disc is encrypted. Digital watermarking of the video content combined with the use of hidden identifiers, e.g. Physical unclonable functions (PUFs) on the disc were proposed to encode copy-control information retrievable from both digital and analog signals.

Protection schemes rely on distinctive features that:

- can be applied to a medium during the manufacturing process, so that a protected medium is distinguishable from an unprotected one.
- cannot be faked, copied, or retroactively applied to an unprotected medium using typical hardware and software.

== Technology ==
=== Filesystems / Dummy files ===
Most CD-ROMs use the ISO9660 file system to organize the available storage space for use by a computer or player. This has the effect of establishing directories (i.e., folders) and files within those directories. Usually, the filesystem is modified to use extensions intended to overcome limitations in the ISO9660 filesystem design. These include Joliet, Rock Ridge, and El Torito extensions. These are, however, compatible additions to the underlying ISO9660 structure, not complete replacements or modifications. The most basic approach for a distinctive feature is to purposely fake some information within the filesystem. Early generations of software copied every single file one by one from the original medium and re-created a new filesystem on the target medium.

=== Sectors ===
A sector is the primary data structure on a CD-ROM accessible to external software (including the OS). On a Mode-1 CD-ROM, each sector contains 2048 bytes of user-data (content) and 304 bytes of structural information. Among other things, the structural information consists of

- the sector number, the sector's relative and absolute logical position
- an error detection code (EDC), which is an advanced checksum used to detect (if possible) read-errors
- an error correction code (ECC), an advanced method of detecting and correcting errors

Using the EDC and ECC information, the drive can detect and repair many (but not all) types of read-error.

Copy protections can use these fields as a distinctive feature by purposely crafting sectors with improper EDC/ECC fields during manufacture. The protection software tries to read those sectors, awaiting read-errors. As early generations of end-user soft/hardware were not able to generate sectors with illegal structural information, this feature could not be re-generated with such soft/hardware. If the sectors forming the distinctive feature have become readable, the medium is presumed to be a copy.

A modification of this approach uses large regions of unreadable sectors with small islands of readable ones interspersed. Most software trying to copy protected media will skip intervals of sectors when confronted with unreadable ones, expecting them all to be bad. In contrast to the original approach, the protection scheme expects the sectors to be readable, supposing the medium to be a copy when read-errors occur.

=== Sub-channels ===
Beside the main-channel which holds all of the user-data, a CD-ROM contains a set of eight sub-channels where certain meta-information can be stored. (For an audio CD, the user-data is the audio itself; for a data CD, it is the filesystem and file data.) One of the sub-channels — the Q-channel — states the drive's current position relative to the beginning of the CD and the current track. This was designed for Audio-CDs (which for a few years were the only CDs), where this information is used to keep the drive on track; nevertheless the Q-channel is filled even on Data-CDs. Another sub-channel, the P-channel (which is the first of the subchannels) carries even more primitive information—a sort of semaphore—indicating the points where each track starts.

As every Q-channel field contains a 16-bit checksum over its content, copy protection can yet again use this field to distinguish between an original medium and a copy. Early generations of end-user soft/hardware calculated the Q-channel by themselves, not expecting them to carry any valuable information.

Modern software and hardware are able to write any information given into the subchannels Q and P.

=== Twin sectors ===
This technique exploits the way the sectors on a CD-ROM are addressed and how the drive seeks from one sector to another. On every CD-ROM the sectors state their logical absolute and relative position in the corresponding sector-headers. The drive can use this information when it is told to retrieve or seek to a certain sector. Note that such information is not physically "hard-wired" into the CD-ROM itself but part of user-controlled data.

A part of an unprotected CD-ROM may look like this (simplified):

Standard CD-ROM
Sector's logical address	...	6551	6552	6553	6554	6555	6556	6557	...
Sector's content	...	Jack	and	Jill	went	up	the	hill	...

When the drive is told to read from or seek to sector 6553, it calculates the physical distance, moves the laser-diode and starts reading from the (spinning) disc, waiting for sector 6553 to come by.

A protected CD-ROM may look like this:

Protected CD-ROM
Sector's logical address	...	6551	6552	6553	6553	6554	6555	6556	6557	...
Sector's content	...	Jack	and	Jill	Mary	went	up	the	hill	...

In this example, a sector was inserted ("Mary") with a sector-address identical to the one right before the insertion-point (6553). When the drive is told to read from or seek to sector 6553 on such a disc, the resulting sector-content depends on the position the drive starts seeking from.

- If the drive has to seek forwards, the sector's original content "Jill" is returned.
- If the drive has to seek backwards, the sector's twin "Mary" is returned.

A protected program can check whether the CD-ROM is original by positioning the drive behind sector 6553 and then reading from it — expecting the Mary version to appear. When a program tries to copy such a CD-ROM, it will miss the twin-sector as the drive skips the second 6553-sector, seeking for sector 6554.

There are more details about this technique (e.g. the twin-sectors need to be recorded in large extents, the SubQ-channel has to be modified etc.) that were omitted. If the twin sectors are right next to each other as shown, the reader would always read the first one, Jill; the twin sectors need to be farther apart on the disc.

=== Data position measurement ===
Stamped CDs are perfect clones and have the data always at the same position, whereas writable media differ from each other. Data Position Measurement (DPM) detects these little physical differences to efficiently protect against duplicates. DPM was first used publicly in 1996 by Link Data Security's CD-Cops. SecuROM 4 and later uses this protection method, as do Nintendo optical discs.

== Changes that followed ==
The Red Book CD-DA audio specification does not include any copy protection mechanism other than a simple anti-copy flag. Starting in early 2002, attempts were made by record companies to market "copy-protected" non-standard compact discs. Philips stated that such discs were not permitted to bear the trademarked Compact Disc Digital Audio logo because they violate the Red Book specification. There was great public outcry over copy-protected discs because many saw it as a threat to fair use. For example, audio tracks on such media cannot be easily added to a personal music collection on a computer's hard disk or a portable (non-CD) music player. Also, many ordinary CD audio players (e.g. in car radios) had problems playing copy-protected media, mostly because they used hardware and firmware components also used in CD-ROM drives. The reason for this reuse is cost efficiency; the components meet the Red Book standard, so no valid reason existed not to use them. Other car stereos that supported CD-ROM discs containing compressed audio files (such as MP3, FLAC, or Windows Media) had to use some CD-ROM drive hardware (meeting the Yellow Book CD-ROM standard) in order to be capable of reading those discs.

In late 2005, Sony BMG Music sparked the Sony CD copy protection scandal when it included a form of copy protection called Extended Copy Protection ("XCP") on discs from 52 artists. Upon inserting such a disc in the CD drive of a computer running Microsoft Windows, the XCP software would be installed. If CD ripper software (or other software, such as a real-time effects program, that reads digital audio from the disc in the same way as a CD ripper) were to subsequently access the music tracks on the CD, XCP would substitute white noise for the audio on the disc.

Technically inclined users and computer security professionals found that XCP contains a rootkit component. After installation, XCP went to great lengths to disguise its existence, and it even attempted to disable the computer's CD drive if XCP was forcibly removed. XCP's efforts to cloak itself unfortunately allowed writers of malware to amplify the damage done by their software, hiding the malware under XCP's cloak if XCP had been installed on the victim's machine. Several publishers of antivirus and anti-spyware software updated their products to detect and remove XCP if found, on the grounds that it is a trojan horse or other malware; and an assistant secretary for the United States' Department of Homeland Security chastised companies that would cause security holes on customers' computers, reminding the companies that they do not own the computers.

Facing resentment and class action lawsuits Sony BMG issued a product recall for all discs including XCP, and announced it was suspending use of XCP on future discs. On November 21, 2005 the Texas Attorney General Greg Abbott sued Sony BMG for XCP and on December 21, 2005 sued Sony BMG for MediaMax copy protection.

=== United Kingdom position ===
The provisions of law allow for redress to buyers of audio CDs with copyright protection. The Copyright, Designs and Patents Act 1988 contains provisions in section 296ZE part VII that allow for "[a] remedy where effective technological measures prevent permitted acts".

In practice, the consumer would make a complaint to the copyright holder of the audio CD, usually a record label. The complaint would contain a request to the holder of the copyright to provide a "workaround" in order to make use of the copy-protected CD, to the extent that a non-copyright protected CD could be used lawfully. Where the consumer believes the copyright holder has not been reasonable in entertaining the request, they are within their rights under the Act to make an application to the Secretary of State to review the merits of the complaint and (if the complaint is upheld) to instruct the copyright holder to implement a workaround circumventing the copyright protection.

Schedule 5A of the Copyright, Designs and Patent Act 1988 lists the permitted acts, to which the provisions of section 296ZE apply (i.e. lists the cases in which the consumer can use the remedy, if the copy protection prevents the user doing a permitted act).

== DVD copy protection ==
Commercially released DVD-Video and DVD-Audio discs typically use one or more copy protection methods to prevent use of unauthorized copies.

=== Content Scramble System (CSS) ===
Content Scramble System (CSS) is an encryption system employed on many commercially produced DVD-Video discs. CSS utilizes a proprietary 40-bit stream cipher algorithm to encrypt disc contents, preventing playback of unauthorized disc copies. CSS also prevents playback of discs on PCs without officially licensed software, such as PowerDVD or WinDVD.

=== Macrovision Analog Protection System ===
Analog Protection System (APS), originally developed by Macrovision, is designed to close the "analog hole" by embedding signals in a DVD player's analog outputs which exploit automatic gain control circuitry present in many VCRs, preventing easy duplication of DVD videos onto VHS. Additionally, digital recording devices, such as DVD recorders, may check analog inputs for the APS signal and disallow recording if it is detected.

=== ARccOS ===
ARccOS (Advanced Regional Copy Control Operating Solution) is a copy protection system used on some DVDs. Designed as an additional layer of protection to be used in conjunction with Content Scramble System (CSS), the system deliberately creates corrupted sectors on the disc, causing copying software to produce errors. The corrupted sectors are in areas of the disk that most standalone DVD players do not access, but most copying software does.

=== HDCP ===
High-bandwidth Digital Content Protection (HDCP) is designed to prevent copying of digital outputs, such as a DVD player's HDMI output. A flag can be set on a DVD-Video disc to trigger a DVD player to encrypt its digital output, allowing display only on licensed TVs or monitors.

=== CPPM ===
Content Protection for Prerecorded Media (CPPM) is used on some DVD-Audio discs to prevent unauthorized copies. CPPM uses a media key block (MKB) to authenticate DVD-Audio players. In order to decrypt the audio, players must obtain a media key from the MKB, which also is encrypted. The player must use its own unique key to decrypt the MKB. If a DVD-Audio player's decryption key is compromised, that key can be rendered useless for decrypting future DVD-Audio discs.

=== Audio watermarking ===
DVD-Audio discs can additionally use an audio watermark in concert with CPPM. If a DVD-Audio player encounters the audio watermark on a disc without a media key block, it will halt playback.

Cinavia is a similar audio watermarking technology that can be applied to film soundtracks. Many DVD players and software (including PlayStation 3 and PowerDVD) check for the watermark. If the Cinavia watermark is detected on a DVD without the appropriate CSS key, playback will stop or audio will be muted.

== See also ==
- List of Compact Disc and DVD copy protection schemes
- List of copy protection schemes
