= Burst cutting area =

Method used to identify optical discs

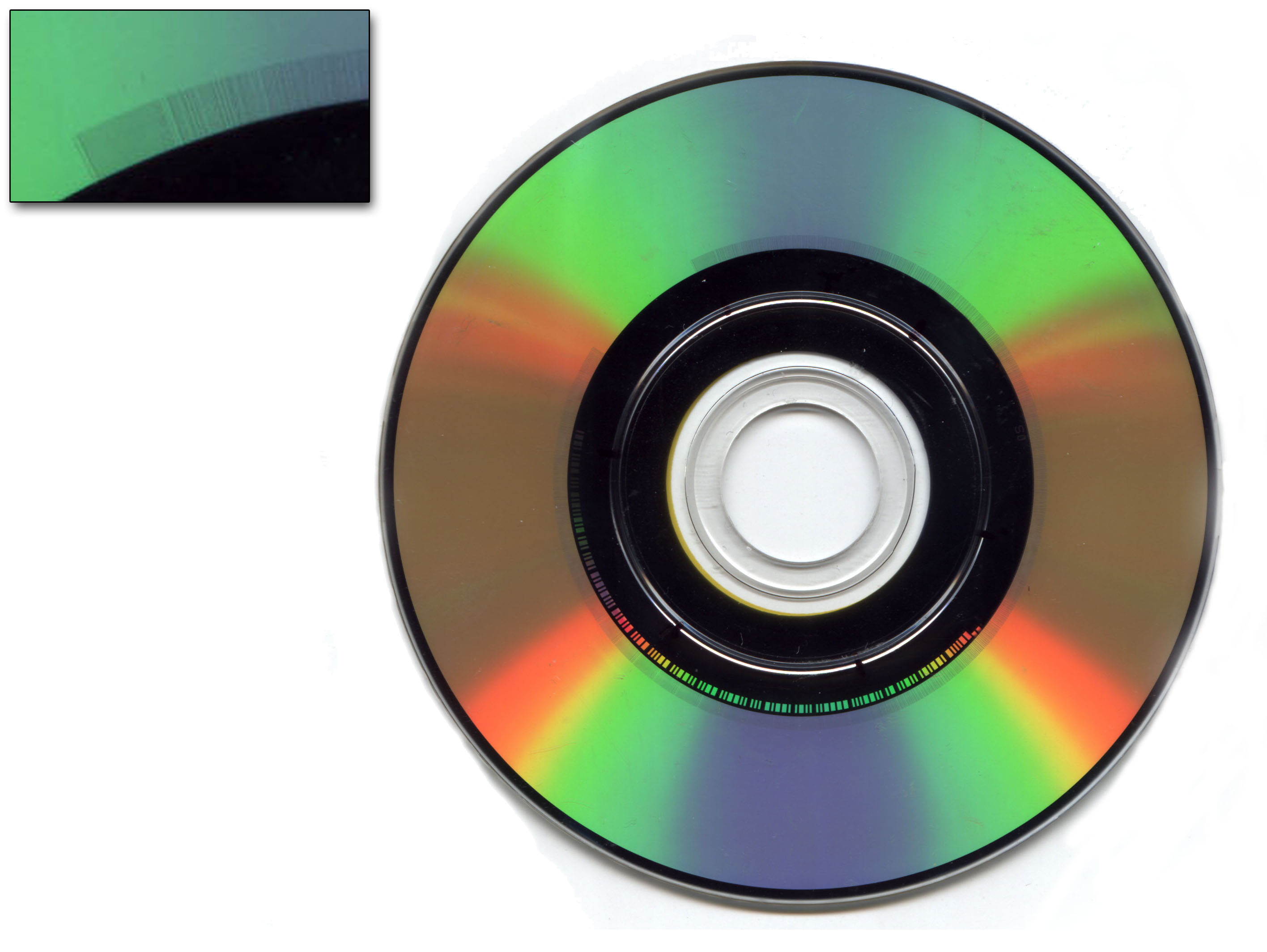
The Burst Cutting Area on an 80 mm DVD

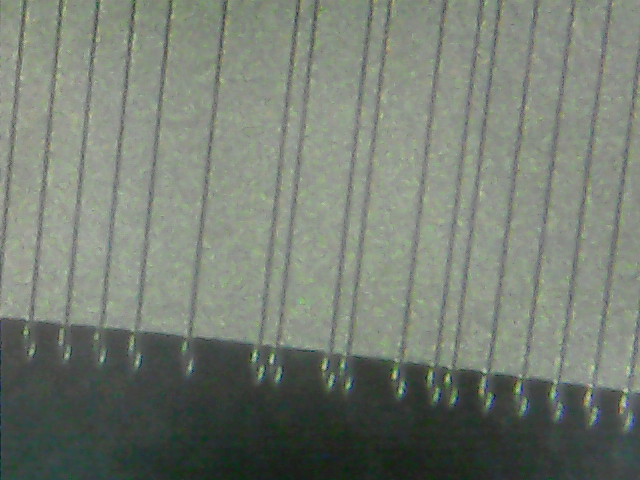
A resync byte and parts of nearby zero bytes on a disc's BCA

In computing, the burst cutting area (BCA) or narrow burst cutting area (NBCA) is the circular area near the center of a DVD, HD DVD or Blu-ray Disc, where a barcode can be written for additional information such as ID codes, manufacturing information, and serial numbers. The BCA can be written during mastering and will be common for all discs from that master or, more usually, will be written using a YAG laser to "cut" the barcode into the aluminum reflective layer of the finished disc, potentially adding a unique barcode to each manufactured disc.

If a BCA mark is present, it is visible to the naked eye between a radius 22.3±0.4 mm and 23.5±0.5 mm. It should not be confused with the IFPI barcode that is present on all pre-recorded discs.

The data stored in the BCA can be from 12 bytes to 188 bytes in steps of 16 bytes. The BCA can be read using the same laser for reading regular data, but requires special circuitry to be decoded. It is not mandatory for DVD players to support reading the BCA, but DVD-ROM drives should, according to the Mt. Fuji specification (an industry-standard optical drive command set). The Burst Cutting Area cannot be written without using special equipment, therefore it can be used as a tamper-proof means of identifying individual discs.

The DIVX format used BCA to uniquely identify every disc. Information for CPRM is stored in the BCA of a DVD-RAM or DVD-R/RW disc. Nintendo optical discs use a BCA mark to prevent the use of copied discs and homebrew games. On Blu-ray discs, a Pre-recorded Media Serial Number (PMSN) can be stored in the BCA.

== See also ==
- Book type
- ROM Mark
- Data position measurement
- Media Identification Code
