= SecuROM =

Sony DRM software

- Developer: Sony DADC
- Release: 1998
- Type: Optical disc copy protection, digital rights management
- Website: support.securom.com/index.html

SecuROM is a CD/DVD copy protection and digital rights management (DRM) system developed by Sony DADC and introduced in 1998. It aims to prevent unauthorised copying and reverse engineering of software, primarily commercial computer games running on Windows. The method of disc protection in later versions is data position measurement, which may be used in conjunction with online activation DRM. SecuROM gained prominence in the late 2000s but generated controversy because of its requirement for frequent online authentication and strict key activation limits. A 2008 class-action lawsuit was filed against Electronic Arts for its use of SecuROM in the video game Spore. Opponents, including the Electronic Frontier Foundation, believe that fair-use rights are restricted by DRM applications such as SecuROM.

== Software ==
SecuROM limits the number of PCs activated at the same time from the same key and is not uninstalled upon removal of the game. SecuROM 7.x was the first version to include the SecuROM Removal Tool, which is intended to help users remove SecuROM after the software with which it was installed has been removed. Most titles now also include a revoke tool to deactivate the license; revoking all licenses would restore the original activation limit. As with Windows activation, a hardware change may appear as a change of computer, and force another activation of the software. Reformatting the computer may not consume an activation, if the Product Activation servers successfully detect it as a re-installation on the same set of hardware. The activation limit may be increased, on a case-by-case basis, if the user is shown to have reached this limit due to several hardware-triggered re-activations on the same PC.

=== Known problems ===
- SecuROM may not detect that the original game disc is in the drive. This can occur on virtually any configuration, and reinserting the disc or rebooting the computer usually resolves the problem.
- Under Windows Vista, SecuROM will prevent a game from running if explicit congestion notification is enabled in Vista's networking configuration.
- Software that can be used to bypass copy protection, such as disk drive emulators and debugging software, will block the launch of the game and generate a security module error. Disabling such software usually fixes the issue, but in some cases uninstallation is required.
- SecuROM conflicts with other software, the best-known being SysInternals' Process Explorer (prior to version 11). Use of Process Explorer before an attempt to run the protected software would produce an error caused by a driver that was kept in memory after Process Explorer was closed. This is solved by either ensuring that Process Explorer is not running in the background when the game is launched, or updating Process Explorer.
- SecuROM has a hardware-level incompatibility with certain brands of optical drives. Workarounds exist.

== Technical and other issues ==
=== BioShock ===
Purchasers of BioShock were required to activate the game online, and users who exceeded their permitted two activations would have to call to get their limit raised. The limit was raised to five activations because an incorrect phone number had been printed on the manual, and because there were no call centers outside of the United States. Separate activations were required for each user on the same machine. 2K Games removed the activation limit in 2008, although online activation was still required. The game is now available completely DRM-free.

=== Mass Effect ===
EA announced in May 2008 that Mass Effect for the PC would use SecuROM 7.x and require that the software be reactivated every 10 days. Customer complaints led EA to remove the 10-day activation, but SecuROM remained tied to the installation, with its product activation facility used to impose a limit of three activations. A call to customer support is required to reset the activation limit. Unlike BioShock, uninstalling the game does not refund a previously used activation. A de-authorization tool was released for the main game, but EA's customer support must still be contacted to deactivate the downloadable expansions.

=== Spore ===
Spore, released by EA on September 7, 2008, uses SecuROM. Spore has seen relatively substantial rates of unauthorized distribution among peer-to-peer groups, and with a reported 1.7 million downloads over BitTorrent networks, was the most user-redistributed game of 2008, according to TorrentFreak's "Top 10 most pirated games of 2008" list. Journalists note that this was a reaction from users unhappy with the copy protection.

EA requires the player to authenticate the game online upon installation. This system was announced after EA's originally planned system, which would have required authentication every 10 days, met opposition from the public. Each individual product key of the game would be limited to use on three computers. This limit was raised to five computers, in response to customer complaints, but only one online user (required to access user-generated content) can be created per copy.

A class-action lawsuit was filed by Maryland resident Melissa Thomas within the U.S. District Court against Electronic Arts over SecuROM's inclusion with Spore. Several other lawsuits have followed.

=== Dragon Age II ===
Reports emerged in March 2011 that EA's Dragon Age II included SecuROM, despite assertions from EA to the contrary. On March 12, 2011, a BioWare representative stated on the official Dragon Age II message boards that the game does not use SecuROM, but instead "a release control product which is made by the same team, but is a completely different product" which was later revealed to be Sony Release Control. The consumer advocacy group Reclaim Your Game has challenged this claim, based on their analysis of the files in question.

=== Final Fantasy VII PC re-release ===
In early August 2012 an updated version of Final Fantasy VII was re-released for PC. The updated version included SecuROM software, which was discovered when an early purchase link was included in the Square Enix store. Users who purchased and downloaded the game were unable to activate the game due to the activation servers not recognizing the activation key for their purchased games.

=== The Sims 2 Ultimate Collection ===
EA released The Sims 2 Ultimate Collection as a free download until July 31, 2014, but did not mention that the download also came with SecuROM included, which was later revealed by the site Reclaim Your Game. SecuROM was removed on November 1, 2017, more than three years after it was last offered on Origin.

=== Tron: Evolution ===
In 2019, due to Disney's decision to end its SecuROM license, Tron: Evolution, which relies on it to authenticate its installation and startup, was rendered unplayable and pulled from the Steam store nearly a decade after its release. Disney claims that efforts are being made to re-release the game without SecuROM, but there has so far been no further assurance of or timetable for such an action.
