= List of copy protection schemes =

This is a list of notable copy protection schemes for various medias.

== Computer Software protection schemes ==
Dongle
Hardware key containing electronic serial number required to run the software; relatively expensive and has no recovery when the hardware breaks.
Product Activation
Requiring user to verify the license, often by entering a Product key in order to activate and use the software; some activation schemes require sending registration information over internet to prevent the same product key from being used by multiple users. In some cases, users are required to call a number to register and receive device-specific serial number.
Bus encryption
Use of encrypted code together with Secure cryptoprocessor so only the machine with cryptoprocessor could execute the program; used in systems that require high security such as ATMs.
Keyfile
A file with activation key that needs to be installed in same directory as software; similarly, a disc media (often installation disc) may be required as key disk for activation.
Code Morphing
Hiding intermediate code by means of code obfuscation so that execution logic is not visible. This method does not protect against runtime tracing.

== Commercial Blu-ray Disc protection schemes ==
AACS
The encrypted content can only be decrypted using combination of media key (obtained from Media Key Block by one of device keys available for each reproduction devices) and the Volume ID (unique identifiers stored on each disk) of the media.
BD+
The BD+ virtual machine embedded in authorized players will execute programs included in Blu-ray discs, allowing to verify the player's keys, transform the output so that content is unscrambled, and/or execute native code to patch the system against vulnerabilities. Based on concept of self-protecting digital content.
ROM-Mark
Recorders will check for watermark that cannot be duplicated by consumer-level recorders, allowing authentic media for movies, musics and games.

== Digital Audio/Video Transmission protection schemes ==
DTCP
Encrypts interconnection between devices so "digital home" technologies such as DVD players and televisions are restricted.
HDCP
Transmitting device checks before sending that receiver is authorized to receive the data. The data is encrypted during transmission to prevent eavesdropping.
Serial Copy Management System
Records in the sub code data bits that expresses whether the media is copy allowed(00), copy once(10) or copy prohibited(11).
Traitor Tracing
Rather than directly preventing copying, embeds user information into files so if they are uploaded, the copyright holder could find out exactly who uploaded the file.

== Protection Schemes for Other Media ==
CGMS-A (Analog Television Signals)
Inserts a waveform into the non-picture Vertical Blanking Interval (VBI) of the analog video signal so compatible device can block or restrict recording when the waveform is detected.
Spiradisc (Floppy Disk)
Writes data on spiraling paths rather than in concentric circles.
USB-Cops (USB-stick)
Using a normal USB-stick as a key.
