= Data position measurement =

Optical disc copy protection scheme

Data position measurement (DPM) is a CD and DVD copy protection mechanism that operates by measuring the physical location of data on an optical disc. Stamped CDs are perfect clones and always have the data at the expected location, while a burned copy would exhibit physical differences. DPM detects these differences to identify user-made copies. DPM was first used publicly in 1996 by Link Data Security's CD-Cops. It was used in volume on Lademans Leksikon published by Egmont in November 1996.

== RMPS ==
DPM can be observed and subsequently encoded into a recordable media physical signature (RMPS). In concert with emulation software RMPS can reproduce the effects of DPM thereby appearing as an original disc and fooling the protection mechanism. This technique was pioneered by the software Alcohol 120%, for which it created the .mds file format.

== See also ==
- ROM Mark
- Burst cutting area
