= RatDVD =

Container format

The ratDVD logo

RatDVD (originally stylized "ratDVD") is the name of a proprietary container format for digital video, developed by Peter Jensen and a group of Russian and Danish university students. The container format is a compressed archive format that holds all features of DVD-Video in a single file. Unlike other container formats like Matroska, it is designed to accurately mirror the exact feature set of standard video DVDs, facilitating round-tripping back to the DVD-Video format.

RatDVD files are created by a computer program of the same name. The video portion of a RatDVD file is compressed with a proprietary video codec named "XEB", thus significantly reducing the overall size: a typical DVD (usually above 4 gigabytes) can be compressed to about 1 or 2 GB, with some loss in video quality due to recompression. The resulting RatDVD file can then be played directly on a computer (as long as the needed codec has been installed) with a DirectShow-compatible DVD player, or converted back into standard DVD format.

RatDVD program is freeware and works on Microsoft Windows. The last version is 0.78 and was released in 2005. The program does not support copy-protected DVDs.
