= User operation prohibition =

The user operation prohibition (abbreviated UOP) is a form of use restriction used on video DVD discs and Blu-ray discs. Most DVD players and Blu-ray players prohibit the viewer from performing a large majority of actions during sections of a DVD that are protected or restricted by this feature, and will display the no symbol or a message to that effect if any of these actions are attempted. It is used mainly for copyright notices or warnings, such as an FBI warning in the United States, and "protected" (i.e., unskippable) commercials.

In 2003, most, if not all, DVD Copy Control Association licensed DVD players implemented UOP. Player manufacturers were required to detect and respond to UOP commands as a condition of obtaining a license from the DVD Format/Logo Licensing Corporation.

== Countermeasures ==
Some DVD players ignore the UOP flag, allowing the user full control over DVD playback. Virtually all players that are not purpose-built DVD player hardware (for example, a player program running on a general purpose computer) ignore the flag. There are also modchips available for some standard DVD players for the same purpose. The UOP flag can be removed in DVD ripper software such as: DVD Decrypter, DVD Shrink, AnyDVD, AVS Video Converter, Digiarty WinX DVD Ripper Platinum, MacTheRipper, HandBrake and K9Copy. On many DVD players, pressing stop-stop-play will cause the DVD player to play the movie immediately, ignoring any UOP flags that would otherwise make advertisements, piracy warnings or trailers unskippable.

Nevertheless, removing UOP does not always provide navigation function in the restricted parts of the DVD. This is because those parts are sometimes lacking the navigation commands which allow skipping to the menu or other parts of the DVD. This has become more common in recent titles, in order to circumvent the UOP disabling that many applications or DVD players offer.

Newer DVD players (i.e. post-c. late 2010) have, however, been designed to override the aforementioned counter-countermeasures. The DVD reader software inside the DVD player automatically generates chapters for parts of the DVD lacking navigation commands, allowing them to be fast-forwarded or skipped; pressing the menu button, even in these previously restricted sections, will cause a jump to the main menu.

== See also ==
- Comparison of DVD ripper software
- DVD Copy Control Association
- Hacking of consumer electronics
