= ROM Mark =

In computing, ROM Mark or BD-ROM Mark is a serialization technology designed to guard against mass production piracy or the mass duplication and sale of unauthorized copies of pre-recorded Blu-ray Discs. Only licensed BD-ROM manufacturers have access to the equipment that can make these unique ROM Marks, thus allowing authentic BD-ROM media like movies and music to be identified.

The ROM Mark contains the Volume ID required to decrypt content encrypted using AACS.

== See also ==
- Burst Cutting Area
- Cinavia
- Data position measurement
- Book type
