= CD-Cops =

CD-ROM protection system

CD-Cops was the first CD-ROM protection system to use the geometry of the CD-ROM media rather than a hidden "mark". It was invented in 1996 by Danish Link Data Security, known for its Cops Copylock key-diskette security used in the 1990s by Lotus 1-2-3.

== Overview ==
As a copy (CD-R or CD-ROM) will have a different geometry, Data Position Measurement needs to be used for copies. The geometry is not known before CDs have been produced, therefore a CD-code expressing the layout of the CD-ROM must be entered the first time a user runs the protected software. Using a special production process in some cases the CD-code is embedded on the CD-ROM. CD-Cops is popular for encyclopaedias/dictionaries and business applications but not used as much for games.

DVD-Cops, based on the same principles, was the first DVD-ROM protection system, made in 1998.
