= Copy protection =

Protection of software, films, music, other media

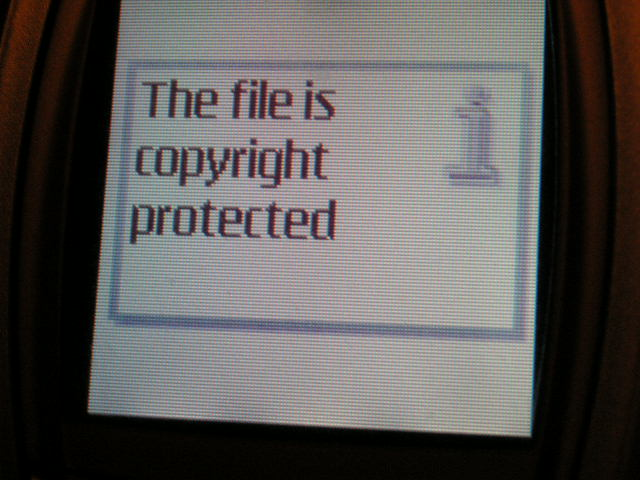
Error message on a Nokia 6810 warning that a file is "copyright protected"

Copy protection, also known as content protection, copy prevention and copy restriction, is any measure to enforce copyright by preventing the reproduction of software, films, music, and other media.

Copy protection is most commonly found on videotapes, DVDs, Blu-ray discs, HD-DVDs, computer software discs, video game discs and cartridges, audio CDs and some VCDs. It also may be incorporated into digitally distributed versions of media and software.

Some methods of copy protection have also led to criticism because it caused inconvenience for paying consumers or secretly installed additional or unwanted software to detect copying activities on the consumer's computer.

== Terminology ==
Media corporations have always used the term copy protection, but critics argue that the term tends to sway the public into identifying with the publishers, who favor restriction technologies, rather than with the users. Copy prevention and copy control may be more neutral terms. "Copy protection" is a misnomer for some systems, because any number of copies can be made from an original and all of these copies will work, but only in one computer, or only with one dongle, or only with another device that cannot be easily copied.

The term is also often related to, and confused with, the concept of digital rights management (DRM). DRM is mostly a more general term because it includes more broad management of rights such as video rentals that can expire after a given amount of time. Unlike DRM, copy restriction may include measures that are not digital. A more appropriate term may be "technological protection measures" (TPMs), which is often defined as the use of technological tools in order to restrict the use or access to a work.

== Business rationale ==
Unauthorized copying and distribution accounted for $2.4 billion per year in lost revenue in the United States alone in 1990, and is assumed to be causing impact on revenues in the music and the video game industry, leading to proposal of stricter copyright laws such as PIPA.

Copy protection is most commonly found on videotapes, DVDs, computer software discs, video game discs and cartridges, audio CDs and some VCDs.

Many media formats are easy to copy using a machine, allowing consumers to distribute copies to their friends, a practice known as "casual copying".

Companies publish works under copyright protection because they believe that the cost of implementing the copy protection will be less than the revenue produced by consumers who buy the product instead of acquiring it through casually copied media.

Opponents of copy protection argue that people who obtain free copies only use what they can get for free and would not purchase their own copy if they were unable to obtain a free copy. Some even argue that free copies increase profit; people who receive a free copy of a music CD may then go and buy more of that band's music, which they would not have done otherwise.

Some publishers have avoided copy-protecting their products on the theory that the resulting inconvenience to their users outweighs any benefit of frustrating "casual copying".

From the perspective of the end user, copy protection is always a cost. DRM and license managers sometimes fail, can be inconvenient to use, and may not afford the user all of the legal use of the product they have purchased.

The term copy protection refers to the technology used to attempt to frustrate copying, and not to the legal remedies available to publishers or authors whose copyrights are violated. Software usage models range from node locking to floating licenses (where a fixed number licenses can be concurrently used across an enterprise), grid computing (where multiple computers function as one unit and so use a common license) and electronic licensing (where features can be purchased and activated online). The term license management refers to broad platforms which enable the specification, enforcement and tracking of software licenses. To safeguard copy protection and license management technologies themselves against tampering and hacking, software anti‑tamper methods are used.

Floating licenses are also being referred to as Indirect Licenses, and are licenses that at the time they are issued, there is no actual user who will use them. That has some technical influence over some of their characteristics. Direct Licenses are issued after a certain user requires it. As an example, an activated Microsoft product, contains a Direct License which is locked to the PC where the product is installed.

From business standpoint, on the other hand, some services now try to monetize on additional services other than the media content so users can have better experience than simply obtaining the copied product.

== Technical challenges ==
I heard these stories that people would invest months on devising copy-protection schemes and then in three hours some kid in San Diego figuring it out.

— Andrew Fluegelman, on why he chose to distribute PC-Talk as shareware.

From a technical standpoint, it seems impossible to completely prevent users from making copies of the media they purchase, as long as a "writer" is available that can write to blank media. All types of media require a "player"—a CD player, DVD player, videotape player, computer or video game console—which must be able to read the media in order to display it to a human.

At a minimum, digital copy protection of non-interactive works is subject to the analog hole: regardless of any digital restrictions, if music can be heard by the human ear, it can also be recorded (at the very least, with a microphone and tape recorder); if a film can be viewed by the human eye, it can also be recorded (at the very least, with a video camera and recorder). In practice, almost-perfect copies can typically be made by tapping into the analog output of a player (e.g. the speaker output or headphone jacks) and, once redigitized into an unprotected form, duplicated indefinitely. Copying text-based content in this way is more tedious, but the same principle applies: if it can be printed or displayed, it can also be scanned and OCRed.

Copying of information goods which are downloaded (rather than being mass-duplicated as with physical media) can be inexpensively customized for each download, and thus restricted more effectively, in a process known as "traitor tracing". They can be encrypted in a fashion which is unique for each user's computer, and the decryption system can be made tamper-resistant.

Copyright protection in content platforms also cause increased market concentration and a loss in aggregate welfare. According to research on the European Directive on copyright in the Digital Single Market on platform competition, only users of large platforms will be allowed to upload content if the content is sufficiently valuable and network effects are strong.

== Methods ==
=== Computer software ===
Copy protection for computer software, especially for games, has been a long cat-and-mouse struggle between publishers and crackers. These were (and are) programmers who defeated copy protection on software as a hobby, add their alias to the title screen, and then distribute the "cracked" product to the network of warez BBSes or Internet sites that specialized in distributing unauthorized copies of software.

==== Early ages ====
When computer software was still distributed in audio cassettes, audio copying was unreliable, while digital copying was time-consuming. Software prices were comparable with audio cassette prices. To make digital copying more difficult, many programs used non-standard loading methods (loaders incompatible with standard BASIC loaders, or loaders that used different transfer speed).

Unauthorized software copying began to be a problem when floppy disks became the common storage media. Copy protection does not exist on CP/M. For other operating systems, the ease of copying varies; Jerry Pournelle wrote in BYTE in 1983 that "Apple users ... have always had the problem. So have those who used TRS-DOS, and I understand that MS-DOS has copy protection features".

==== 1980s ====
Pournelle disliked copy protection and, except for games, refused to review software that used it. He did not believe that it was useful, writing in 1983 that "For every copy protection scheme there's a hacker ready to defeat it. Most involve so-called nibble/nybble copiers, which try to analyze the original disk and then make a copy". In 1985, he wrote that "dBASE III is copy-protected with one of those 'unbreakable' systems, meaning that it took the crackers almost three weeks to break it". "The only real effect of copy-protection is to inconvenience honest users", Edward Mendelson wrote in The Yale Review: "Publishers like Microsoft assume you are (1) a crook who will pirate their program, and (2) an idiot who won't know how". IBM's Don Estridge agreed: "I guarantee that whatever scheme you come up with will take less time to break than to think of it." While calling piracy "a threat to software development. It's going to dry up the software", he said "It's wrong to copy-protect programs ... There ought to be some way to stop [piracy] without creating products that are unusable".

Software vendors disliked piracy, but did not attempt to sue the vendors of nibble copiers because copyright law allows users to produce backup copies of software. Unlike music piracy, no significant software piracy market existed. A more serious problem was a company or other large organization purchasing a single copy of an application and producing many copies for itself. Philippe Kahn of Borland justified copy-protecting Sidekick because, unlike his company's unprotected Turbo Pascal, Sidekick can be used without accompanying documentation and is for a general audience. Kahn said, according to Pournelle, that "any good hacker can defeat the copy protection in about an hour"; its purpose was to prevent large companies from purchasing one copy and easily distributing it internally. While reiterating his dislike of copy protection, Pournelle wrote "I can see Kahn's point".

After Sheldon Richman wrote in 1985 about unexpected messages ("The Shadow knows. Trashing program disk") and sounds occurring during use of a legitimate copy of a Microsoft application, the company removed copy protection from some software. Jeff Raikes of Microsoft attributed the messages to a former employee. A 1987 Computerworld survey found that Lotus 1-2-3's copy protection was the top complaint, with one customer stating that it "just makes life miserable for people". Lotus said that it would remove copy protection on future releases of the software. (The United States Air Force preferred non copy-protected software, affecting vendors' bids to sell products like 1-2-3 and competitors to the military.) In 1989, Gilman Louie, head of Spectrum HoloByte, stated that copy protection added about $0.50 per copy to the cost of production of a game. Other software relied on complexity; Antic in 1988 observed that WordPerfect for the Atari ST "is almost unusable without its manual of over 600 pages!". (The magazine was mistaken; the ST version was so widely pirated that the company threatened to discontinue it.)

Copy protection sometimes causes software not to run on clones, such as the Apple II‑compatible Laser 128, or even the genuine Apple IIc, or Commodore 64 with certain peripherals.

To limit reusing activation keys to install the software on multiple machines, it has been attempted to tie the installed software to a specific machine by involving some unique feature of the machine. Serial number in ROM could not be used because some machines do not have them. Some popular surrogate for a machine serial number were date and time (to the second) of initialization of the hard disk drive or MAC address of Ethernet cards (although this is programmable on modern cards). With the rise of virtualization, however, the practice of locking has to add to these simple hardware parameters to still prevent copying.

=== Early video games ===
During the 1980s and 1990s, video games sold on audio cassette and floppy disks were sometimes protected with an external user-interactive method that demanded the user to have the original package or a part of it, usually the manual. Copy protection was activated not only at installation, but every time the game was executed.

Several imaginative and creative methods have been employed, in order to be both fun and hard to copy. These include:

- The most common method was requiring the player to enter a specific word (often chosen at random) from the manual. A variant of this technique involved matching a picture provided by the game to one in the manual and providing an answer pertaining to the picture (Ski or Die, 4D Sports Boxing and James Bond 007: The Stealth Affair used this technique). Buzz Aldrin's Race Into Space (in the floppy version, but not the CD version) required the user to input an astronaut's total duration in space (available in the manual) before the launch of certain missions. If the answer was incorrect, the mission would suffer a catastrophic failure.
- Manuals containing information and hints vital to the completion of the game, like answers to riddles (Conquests of Camelot, King's Quest VI), recipes of spells (King's Quest III), keys to deciphering non-Latin writing systems (Ultima series, see also Ultima writing systems), maze guides (Manhunter), dialogue spoken by other characters in the game (Wasteland, Dragon Wars), excerpts of the storyline (most Advanced Dungeons and Dragons games and Wing Commander), or a radio frequency to use to communicate with a character to further a game (Metal Gear Solid).
- Some sort of code with symbols, not existing on the keyboard or the ASCII code. This code was arranged in a grid, and had to be entered via a virtual keyboard at the request "What is the code at line 3 row 2?". These tables were printed on dark paper (Maniac Mansion, Uplink), or were visible only through a red transparent layer (Indiana Jones and the Last Crusade), making the paper very difficult to photocopy. Another variant of this method — most famously used on the ZX Spectrum version of Jet Set Willy — was a card with color sequences at each grid reference that had to be entered before starting the game. This also prevented monochrome photocopying. It had been thought that the codes in the tables were based on a mathematical formula which could be calculated by using the row, line and page number if the formula was known, a function of the disk space requirement of the data. Later research proved that this was not the case.
- The Secret of Monkey Island offered a rotating wheel with halves of pirate's faces. The game showed a face composed of two different parts and asked when this pirate was hanged on a certain island. The player then had to match the faces on the wheel, and enter the year that appeared on the island-respective hole. Its sequel had the same concept, but with magic potion ingredients. Other games that employed the code wheel system include Star Control.
- Zork games such as Beyond Zork and Zork Zero came with "feelies" which contained information vital to the completion of the game. For example, the parchment found from Zork Zero contained clues vital to solving the final puzzle. However, whenever the player attempts to read the parchment, they are referred to the game package.
- The Lenslok system used a plastic prismatic device, shipped with the game, which was used to descramble a code displayed on screen.
- Early copies of The Playroom from Broderbund Software included a game called "What Is Missing?", in which every fifth time the program was booted up, the player would see a pattern and have to refer to the back of the manual to find which of 12 objects from the spinner counting game would match the pattern seen on the back of the manual in order to open the game.

All of these methods proved to be troublesome and tiring for the players, and as such greatly declined in usage by the mid-1990s, at which point the emergence of CDs as the primary video game medium made copy protection largely redundant, since CD copying technology was not widely available at the time.

Some game developers, such as Markus Persson, have encouraged consumers and other developers to embrace the reality of unlicensed copying and utilize it positively to generate increased sales and marketing interest.

=== Videotape ===
Starting in 1985 with the video release of The Cotton Club (Beta and VHS versions only), Macrovision licensed to publishers a technology that exploits the automatic gain control feature of VCRs by adding pulses to the vertical blanking sync signal. These pulses may negatively affect picture quality, but succeed in confusing the recording-level circuitry of many consumer VCRs. This technology, which is aided by U.S. legislation mandating the presence of automatic gain-control circuitry in VCRs, is said to "plug the analog hole" and make VCR-to-VCR copies impossible, although an inexpensive circuit is widely available that will defeat the protection by removing the pulses. Macrovision had patented methods of defeating copy prevention, giving it a more straightforward basis to shut down manufacture of any device that descrambles it than often exists in the DRM world. While used for pre‑recorded tapes, the system was not adopted for television broadcasts; Michael J. Fuchs of HBO said in 1985 that Macrovision was "not good technology" because it reduced picture quality and consumers could easily bypass it, while Peter Chernin of Showtime said "we want to accommodate our subscribers and we know they like to tape our movies".

== Notable payloads ==
Over time, software publishers (especially in the case of video games) became creative about crippling the software in case it was duplicated. These games would initially show that the copy was successful, but eventually render themselves unplayable via subtle methods. Many games use the "code checksumming" technique to prevent alteration of code to bypass other copy protection. Important constants for the game – such as the accuracy of the player's firing, the speed of their movement, etc. – are not included in the game but calculated from the numbers making up the machine code of other parts of the game. If the code is changed, the calculation yields a result which no longer matches the original design of the game and the game plays improperly.

- Superior Soccer had no outward signs of copy protection, but if it decided it was not a legitimate copy, it made the soccer ball in the game invisible, making it impossible to play the game.
- In Sid Meier's Pirates!, if the player entered in the wrong information, they could still play the game, but with substantially increased difficulty.
- The Games: Winter Challenge has multiple checks for its code wheel protection. If not all are bypassed various events are unwinnable, without notifying the player. GOG.com did not fully remove the checks from its legally sold version of the game and The Games: Summer Challenge, causing customer complaints.
- As a more satirical nod to the issue, if the thriller-action game Alan Wake detects that the game is cracked or a pirated copy, it will replace tips in loading screens with messages telling the player to buy the game. If a new game is created on the copied game, an additional effect will take place. As a more humorous nod to "piracy", Alan Wake will gain a black eyepatch over his right eye, complete with a miniature Jolly Roger.
- While the copy protection in Zak McKracken and the Alien Mindbenders was not hidden as such, the repercussions of missing the codes was unusual: the player ended up in jail (permanently), and the police officer gave a lengthy and condescending speech about software copying.
- In case of copied versions of The Settlers III, the iron smelters only produced pigs (a play on pig iron); weaponsmiths require iron to produce weapons, so players could not amass arms.
- Bohemia Interactive developed a unique and very subtle protection system for its game Operation Flashpoint: Cold War Crisis. Dubbed FADE, if it detects an unauthorized copy, it does not inform the player immediately but instead progressively corrupts aspects of the game (such as reducing the weapon accuracy to zero) to the point that it eventually becomes unplayable. The message "Original discs don't FADE" will eventually appear if the game is detected as being an unauthorized copy.
  - FADE is also used in ArmA II, and will similarly diminish the accuracy of the player's weapons, as well as induce a "drunken vision" effect, where the screen becomes wavy, should the player be playing on an unauthorized copy.
  - This system was also used in Take On Helicopters, where the screen blurred and distorted when playing a counterfeit copy, making it hard to safely pilot a helicopter.
  - The IndyCar Series also utilizes FADE technology to safeguard against piracy by making races very difficult to win on a pirated version. The penultimate section of the game's manual states:

Copying commercial games, such as this one, is a criminal offense and copyright infringement.

Copying and re-supplying games such as this one can lead to a term of imprisonment.
Think of a pirated game as stolen property.
This game is protected by the FADE system. You can play with a pirated game- but not for long. The quality of a pirated game will degrade over time.

Purchase only genuine software at legitimate stores.

- Batman: Arkham Asylum contained a code that disabled Batman's glider cape, making some areas of the game very difficult to complete and a certain achievement/trophy impossible to unlock (gliding continuously for over 100m).
- The PC version of Grand Theft Auto IV has a copy protection that swings the camera as though the player was drunk. If the player enters a car and motorcycle or boat it will automatically throttle, making it difficult to steer. It also damages the vehicle, making it vulnerable to collisions and bullets. An update to the game prevented unauthorised copies from accessing the in-game web browser, making it impossible to finish the game as some missions involve browsing the web for objectives.
- EarthBound is well-documented for its extensive use of checksums to ensure that the game is being played on legitimate hardware. If the game detects that it is being played on a European SNES, it refuses to boot, as the first of several checksums has failed. A second checksum will weed out most unauthorized copies of the game, but hacking the data to get past this checksum will trigger a third checksum that makes enemy encounters appear much more often than in an authorized copy, and if the player progresses through the game without giving up (or cracks this protection), a final checksum code will activate before the final boss battle, freezing the game and deleting all the save files. A similar copy protection system was used in Spyro: Year of the Dragon, although it only uses one copy protection check at the beginning of the game (see below).
- In an unauthorized version of the PC edition of Mass Effect, the game save mechanism did not work and the in-game galactic map caused the game to crash. As the galactic map is needed to travel to different sections of the game, the player became stuck in the first section of the game.
- If an unauthorized version of The Sims 2 was used, the Build Mode would not work properly. Walls could not be built on the player's property, which prevented the player from building any custom houses. Some furniture and clothing selections would not be available either.
- A March 2009 update to the BeeJive IM iPhone app included special functionality for users of the unauthorized version: the screen would read "PC LOAD LETTER" whenever the user tried to establish a connection to any IM service, then quickly switch to a YouTube clip from the movie Office Space.
- Command & Conquer: Red Alert 2 and The Lord of the Rings: The Battle for Middle-earth have a copy protection system that completely wipes out the player's forces briefly after a battle begins on an unlicensed copy. However, some who purchased the latter have encountered a bug that caused this copy protection scheme to trigger when it was not supposed to.
- If a player pirated the Nintendo DS version of Michael Jackson: The Experience, vuvuzela noises will play over the notes during a song, which then become invisible. The game will also freeze if the player tries to pause it.
- Older versions of Autodesk 3ds Max use a dongle for copy protection; if it is missing, the program will randomly corrupt the points of the user's model during usage, destroying their work.
- Older versions of CDRWIN used a serial number for initial copy protection. However, if this check was bypassed, a second hidden check would activate causing a random factor to be introduced into the CD burning process, producing corrupted "coaster" disks.
- Terminate, a BBS terminal package, would appear to operate normally if cracked but would insert a warning that a pirated copy was in use into the IEMSI login packet it transmitted, where the sysop of any BBS the user called could clearly read it.
- Ubik's Musik, a music creation tool for the Commodore 64, would transform into a Space Invaders game if it detected that a cartridge-based copying device had attempted to interrupt it. This copy protection system also doubles as an Easter egg, as the message that appears when it occurs is not hostile ("Plug joystick in port 1, press fire, and no more resetting/experting!").
- The Amiga version of Bomberman featured a multitap peripheral that also acted as a dongle. Data from the multitap was used to calculate the time limit of each level. If the multitap was missing, the time limit would be calculated as 0, causing the level to end immediately.
- Nevermind, a puzzle game for the Amiga, contained code that caused an unlicensed version of the game to behave as a demo. The game would play three levels sampled from throughout the game, and then give the message "You have completed three levels; however there are 100 levels to complete on the original disc."
- In Spyro: Year of the Dragon, the game performs regular checksums over its own code to detect tampering. If a modification is identified, the game will slowly employ a litany of measures intended to slow the player down, including randomly removing gems from the world and reversing the player's egg collection progress. The final boss also becomes unbeatable, as the game returns the player to the beginning of the game (and wipes their save file at the same time) around half a minute into the battle.
- The Atari Jaguar console would freeze at startup and play the sound of an enraged jaguar snarling if the inserted cartridge failed the initial security check.
- The Lenslok copy protection system gave an obvious message if the lens-coded letters were entered incorrectly, but if the user soft-reset the machine, the areas of memory occupied by the game would be flooded with the message "THANK YOU FOR YOUR INTEREST IN OUR PRODUCT. NICE TRY. LOVE BJ/NJ" to prevent the user examining leftover code to crack the protection.
- An update to the sandbox game Garry's Mod enabled a copy protection mechanism that outputs the error "Unable to shade polygon normals" if the game detects that it has been copied. The error also includes the user's Steam ID as an error ID, meaning that users can be identified by their Steam account when asking for help about the error over the Internet.
- The Atari version of Alternate Reality: The Dungeon would have the player's character attacked by two unbeatable "FBI Agents" if it detected a cracked version. The FBI agents would also appear when restoring a save which was created by such a version, even if the version restoring the save was legal.
- VGA Planets, a play-by-BBS strategy game, contained code in its server which would check all clients' submitted turns for suspect registration codes. Any player deemed to be using a cracked copy, or cheating in the game, would have random forces destroyed throughout the game by an unbeatable enemy called "The Tim Continuum" (after the game's author, Tim Wissemann). A similar commercial game, Stars!, would issue empty turn updates for players with invalid registration codes, meaning that none of their orders would ever be carried out.
- On a copied version of the original PC version of Postal, as soon as the game was started, the player character would immediately shoot himself in the head.
- In Serious Sam 3: BFE, if the game code detects what it believes to be an unauthorized copy, an invincible scorpion-like monster is spawned in the beginning of the game with high speeds, melee attacks, and attacks from a range with twin chainguns making the game extremely difficult and preventing the player from progressing further. Also in the level "Under the Iron Cloud", the player's character will spin out-of-control looking up in the air.
- An unauthorized copy of Pokémon Black and White and their sequels will run as if it were normal, but the Pokémon will not gain any experience points after a battle. This has since been solved by patching the game's files.
- If Ace Attorney Investigations 2: Prosecutor's Gambit detects an illegitimate or downloaded copy of the game, it will convert the entire game's text into the game's symbol based foreign language, Borginian, which cannot be translated in any way.
- The unlicensed version of indie game Game Dev Tycoon, in which the player runs a game development company, will dramatically increase the piracy rate of the games the player releases to the point where no money can be made at all, and disable the player's ability to take any action against it.
- In the stand-alone expansion to Crytek's Crysis, Crysis Warhead, players who pirated the game will have their ammunition replaced with chickens that inflict no damage and have very little knockback, rendering ranged combat impossible.
- In Crytek's Crysis 3, if a player used an unlicensed copy of the game, they are not able to defeat the last boss (The Alpha Ceph), thus making it impossible to beat the game.
- In Mirror's Edge, copy protection will prevent its player character, Faith, from sprinting, making it impossible for players to jump over long gaps and progress further on a pirated copy.
- In The Legend of Zelda: Spirit Tracks if the player is playing a pirated copy of the game it will remove the train control UI if it detects that it has been pirated, which effectively stonewalls the player at the train's tutorial section very early on and thus making the game unbeatable.

The usage of copy protection payloads which lower playability of a game without making it clear that this is a result of copy protection is now generally considered unwise, due to the potential for it to result in unaware players with unlicensed copies spreading word-of-mouth that a game is of low quality. The authors of FADE explicitly acknowledged this as a reason for including the explicit warning message.

== Anti-piracy ==
Anti-piracy measures are efforts to fight against copyright infringement, counterfeiting, and other violations of intellectual property laws.

It includes, but is by no means limited to, the combined efforts of corporate associations (such as the RIAA and MPA), law enforcement agencies (such as the FBI and Interpol), and various international governments to combat copyright infringement relating to various types of creative works, such as software, music and films. These measures often come in the form of copy protection measures such as DRM, or measures implemented through a content protection network, such as Distil Networks or Incapsula. Richard Stallman and the GNU Project have criticized the use of the word "piracy" in these situations, saying that publishers use the word to refer to "copying they don't approve of" and that "they [publishers] imply that it is ethically equivalent to attacking ships on the high seas, kidnapping and murdering the people on them". Certain forms of anti-piracy (such as DRM) are considered by consumers to control the use of the products content after sale.

In the case MPAA v. Hotfile (legally Disney Enterprises, Inc. v. Hotfile Corp.), Judge Kathleen M. Williams partially granted a motion denying all parties the usage of words Hotfile viewed as "pejorative" during the trial. This list included the word "piracy", the use of which, as stated by Hotfile, would serve no purpose but to misguide and inflame the jury. The plaintiff argued the common use of the terms when referring to copyright infringement should invalidate the motion, but the Judge did not concur.

=== Anti-piracy in file sharing ===
Today, copyright infringement is often facilitated by the use of file sharing. In fact, infringement accounts for 23.8% of all internet traffic in 2013. In an effort to cut down on this, both large and small entertainment and music corporations have issued DMCA takedown notices, filed lawsuits, and pressed criminal prosecution of those who host these file sharing services.

== Anti-counterfeiting and gun control ==
The EURion constellation is used by many countries to prevent color photocopiers from producing counterfeit currency. The Counterfeit Deterrence System is used to prevent counterfeit bills from being produced by image editing software. Similar technology has been proposed to prevent 3D printing of firearms, for reasons of gun control rather than copyright.

== See also ==
- Cheat cartridge
- Copyright infringement § Preventive measures
- Core dump
- Digital watermarking
- List of copy protection schemes
- Software license manager
- Sony BMG copy protection rootkit scandal
- Trade group efforts against file sharing
