= Phonograph cylinder =

Medium for recording and reproducing sound

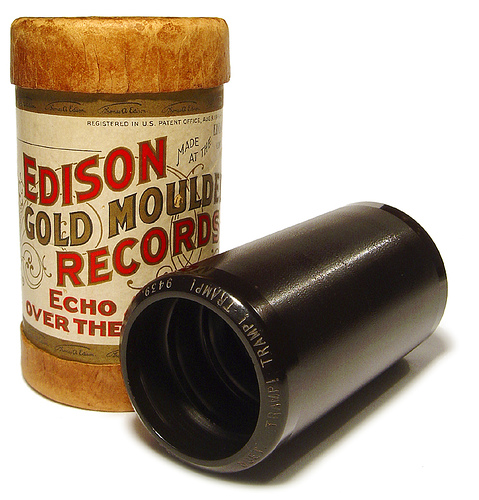
- An Edison Gold Mould cylinder record, taken out of its storage tube (left), from c. 1900s
- Capacity: 2 (and later 4) minutes
- Released: c. 1888
- Discontinued: 1929

Phonograph cylinders (also referred to as Edison cylinders after their creator Thomas Edison) are the earliest commercial medium for recording and reproducing sound. Known simply as records in their heyday (c. 1896–1908), a name since passed to phonograph records, these hollow cylindrical objects have an audio recording engraved on the outside surface which can be reproduced when they are played on a mechanical cylinder phonograph. The first cylinders were wrapped with tin foil but the improved version made of wax was created a decade later, after which they were commercialized. In the 1910s, the competing disc record system triumphed in the marketplace to become the dominant commercial audio medium.

== Early development ==
In December 1877, Thomas Edison and his team invented the phonograph using a thin sheet of tin foil wrapped around a hand-cranked, grooved metal cylinder. Tin foil was not a practical recording medium for either commercial or artistic purposes, and the crude hand-cranked phonograph was only marketed as a novelty, to little or no profit. Edison moved on to developing a practical incandescent electric light, and the next improvements to sound recording technology were made by others.

Following seven years of research and experimentation at their Volta Laboratory, Charles Sumner Tainter, Alexander Graham Bell, and Chichester Bell introduced wax as the recording medium, and engraving, rather than indenting, as the recording method. In 1887, their Graphophone system was being put to the test of practical use by official reporters of the US Congress, with commercial units later being produced by the Dictaphone Corporation. After this system was demonstrated to Edison's representatives, Edison quickly resumed work on the phonograph. He settled on a thicker all-wax cylinder, the surface of which could be repeatedly shaved down for reuse. Both the Graphophone and Edison's Perfected Phonograph were commercialized in 1888. Eventually, a patent-sharing agreement was signed, and the wax-coated cardboard tubes were abandoned in favor of Edison's all-wax cylinders as an interchangeable standard format.

One of the earliest surviving recordings of music
1888 recording of Arthur Sullivan's "The Lost Chord", recorded by George Gouraud, and played at the August 14, 1888, press conference that introduced the phonograph to London.

Prerecorded wax cylinders were marketed beginning in 1889 and had professionally-made recordings of music or humorous monologues in their grooves. At first, the only customers for them were proprietors of nickelodeons—the first jukeboxes—installed in arcades and taverns, but within a few years, private owners of phonographs were increasingly buying them for home use. Unlike later, shorter-playing, high-speed cylinders, early cylinder recordings were usually cut at a speed of 120 rpm and could play for as long as three minutes. They were made of a relatively soft wax formulation and would wear out after they were played a few dozen times. The buyer could then use a mechanism which left their surfaces shaved smooth so new recordings could be made on them.

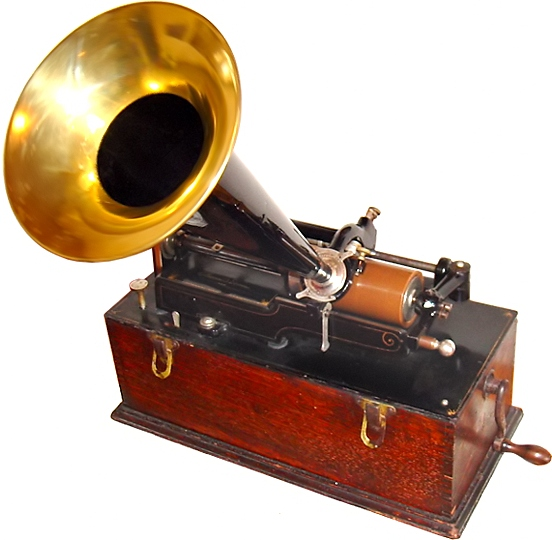
Edison wax cylinder phonograph c. 1899

Cylinder machines of the late 1880s and the 1890s were usually sold with recording attachments. The ability to record as well as play back sound was an advantage of cylinder phonographs over the competition from cheaper disc record phonographs, which began to be mass-marketed at the end of the 1890s, as the disc system machines could be used only to play back prerecorded sound.

In the earliest stages of phonograph manufacturing, various incompatible, competing types of cylinder recordings were made. A standard system was decided upon by Edison Records, Columbia Phonograph, and other companies in the late 1880s. The standard cylinders are about 4 inches (10 cm) long, 2 1/4 inches (5.7 cm) in diameter, and play about two minutes of recorded material.

Originally, all cylinders sold needed to be recorded live on the softer brown wax, which wore out after as few as 20 plays. Later cylinders were reproduced either mechanically or by linking phonographs together with rubber tubes.

Over the years, the type of wax used in cylinders was improved and hardened, so that cylinders could be played with good quality over 100 times. In 1902, Edison Records launched a line of improved, hard wax cylinders marketed as "Edison Gold Moulded Records". The major development of this line of cylinders is that Edison had developed a process that allowed a mold to be made from a master cylinder, which then permitted the production of several hundred cylinders to be made from the mold. The process was labeled Gold Moulded because of the gold vapor that was given off by gold electrodes used in the process.

== Commercial packaging ==
Song of the "Ujangong" mask dance
Phonograph cylinder recorded in German New Guinea on August 23, 1904, by German anthropologist Rudolf Pöch

The earliest soft wax cylinders were sold wrapped in thick cotton batting. Later, molded hard-wax cylinders were sold in boxes with a cotton lining. Celluloid cylinders were sold in unlined boxes. These protective boxes were normally kept and used to house the cylinders after purchase. Their general appearance led bandleader John Philip Sousa to deride their contents as canned music, an epithet he borrowed from Mark Twain.

== Hard plastic cylinders ==
1910 Indestructible Record
"Auld Lang Syne", sung by Frank C. Stanley in 1910

On March 20, 1900, Thomas B. Lambert was granted a US patent (645,920) that described a process for mass-producing cylinders made from celluloid, an early hard plastic. (Henri Jules Lioret of France was producing celluloid cylinders as early as 1893, but they were individually recorded rather than molded.) That same year, the Lambert Company of Chicago began selling cylinder records made of the material. They would not break if dropped and could be played thousands of times without wearing out. The color was changed to black in 1903, but brown and blue cylinders were also produced. The coloring was purportedly because the dyes reduced surface noise. Unlike wax, the hard, inflexible material could not be shaved and recorded over, but it had the advantage of being nearly permanent. A 1905 Edison Phonograph may be seen and heard playing a celluloid cylinder at the Musical Museum, Brentford, England and the quality of the sound is surprisingly good.

This superior technology was licensed by the Indestructible Record Company in 1906 and Columbia Phonograph Company in 1908. The Edison Bell company in Europe had separately licensed the technology and were able to market Edison's titles in both wax (popular series) and celluloid (indestructible series).

In late 1908, Edison had introduced wax cylinders that played for nominally four minutes (instead of the usual two) under the Amberol brand. They were made from a harder (and more fragile) form of wax to withstand the smaller stylus used to play them. The longer playing time was achieved by reducing the groove size and placing them half as far apart. In 1912, the Edison company eventually acquired Lambert's patents to the celluloid technology, and almost immediately started production under a variation of their existing Amberol brand as Edison Blue Amberol Records.

Edison designed several phonograph types, both with internal and external horns for playing these improved cylinder records. The internal horn models were called Amberolas. Edison marketed its Fireside model phonograph with a gearshift and a 'model K' reproducer with two different styli, which allowed it to play both two-minute and four-minute cylinders.

== Decline ==
Cylinder records continued to compete with the growing disc record market into the 1910s, when discs won the commercial battle. In 1912, Columbia Records, which had been selling both discs and cylinders, dropped the cylinder format, while Edison introduced his Diamond Disc format, played with a diamond stylus. Beginning in 1915, new Edison cylinder issues consisted of acoustic dubbings from Edison disc masters; they therefore had lower audio quality than the disc originals. Although his cylinders continued to be sold in steadily dwindling and eventually minuscule quantities, Edison continued to support the owners of cylinder phonographs by making new titles available in that format until the company ceased manufacturing all records and phonographs in November 1929. Many of the later issued Blue Amberols were dubbed electrically from electrical recorded masters.

== Later applications ==
Cylinder phonograph technology continued to be used for Dictaphone and Ediphone recordings for office use for decades.

In 1947, Dictaphone replaced wax cylinders with their Dictabelt technology, which cut a mechanical groove into a plastic belt instead of into a wax cylinder. This was later replaced by magnetic tape recording. However, cylinders for older style dictating machines continued to be available for some years, and it was not unusual to encounter cylinder dictating machines into the 1950s.

In the late 20th and early 21st century, new recordings have been made on cylinders for the novelty effect of using obsolete technology. Probably the most famous of these are by They Might Be Giants, who in 1996 recorded "I Can Hear You" and three other songs, performed without electricity, on an 1898 Edison wax recording studio phonograph at the Edison National Historic Site in West Orange, New Jersey. This song was released on Factory Showroom in 1996 and re-released on the 2002 compilation Dial-A-Song: 20 Years of They Might Be Giants. The other songs recorded were "James K. Polk", "Maybe I Know", and "The Edison Museum", the last a song about the site of the recording. These recordings were officially released online as MP3 files in 2001.

Small numbers of cylinders have been manufactured in the 21st century out of modern long-lasting materials. Two companies engaged in such enterprise are the Seka Phonograph Company of Bay City, Michigan, the Vulcan Cylinder Record Company of Sheffield, England, and the Wizard Cylinder Records Company in Baldwin, New York.

In 2010, the British musical group The Men That Will Not Be Blamed for Nothing released the track "Sewer", from their debut album, Now That's What I Call Steampunk! Volume 1 on a wax cylinder in a limited edition of 40, of which only 30 were put on sale. The box set came with instructions on how to make a cylinder player for less than £20. The BBC covered the release on BBC Click, BBC Online, and BBC Radio 5 Live.

In June 2017, the Cthulhu Breakfast Club podcast released a special limited wax cylinder edition of a show.

In April 2019, the podcast Hello Internet released ten limited edition wax cylinder recordings.

In May 2023, Needlejuice Records released wax cylinder singles for Lemon Demon songs "Touch-Tone Telephone" and "The Oldest Man On MySpace", from albums Spirit Phone and Dinosaurchestra, respectively. They also released the Tally Hall songs Hidden in the Sand and Mucka Blucka on the format, both from the album Marvin's Marvelous Mechanical Museum (album).

== Preservation of cylinder recordings ==
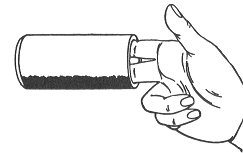
Proper way to hold a cylinder record: put fingers on the inside; do not touch the outer surface which has the recording.

Because of the nature of the recording medium, playback of many cylinders can cause degradation of the recording. The replay of cylinders diminishes their fidelity and degrades their recorded signals. Additionally, when exposed to humidity, mold can penetrate a cylinder's surface and cause the recording to have surface noise. Currently, the only professional machines manufactured for the playback of cylinder recordings are the Archéophone player, designed by Henri Chamoux and the Endpoint Cylinder and Dictabelt Machine by Nicholas Bergh. The Archéophone is used by the Edison National Historic Site, Bowling Green State University (Bowling Green, Ohio), the Department of Special Collections at the University of California, Santa Barbara Library, and many other libraries and archives, including the Endpoint by The New York Public Library for the Performing Arts.

In an attempt to preserve the historic content of the recordings, cylinders can be read with a confocal microscope and converted to a digital audio format. The resulting sound clip in most cases sounds better than stylus playback from the original cylinder. Having an electronic version of the original recordings enables archivists to open access to the recordings to a wider audience. This technique also has the potential to allow for reconstruction of damaged or broken cylinders.

An example of a heavily degraded cylinder: Handel's Israel in Egypt (June 29, 1888)
This was played at the conference introducing the phonograph to London

1888 speech by Arthur Sullivan at the Little Menlo, London
One of the earliest surviving wax cylinder recordings

Brown wax home recording of man and child singing, singing, speaking, and whistling
A home recording on wax cylinder, selections including Santa Claus in Holland, the Lord's prayer, and Irish Washerwoman, recorded over piano music

== Gallery ==
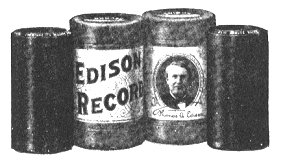
Two Edison cylinder records (left and right) and their cylindrical cardboard boxes (center)

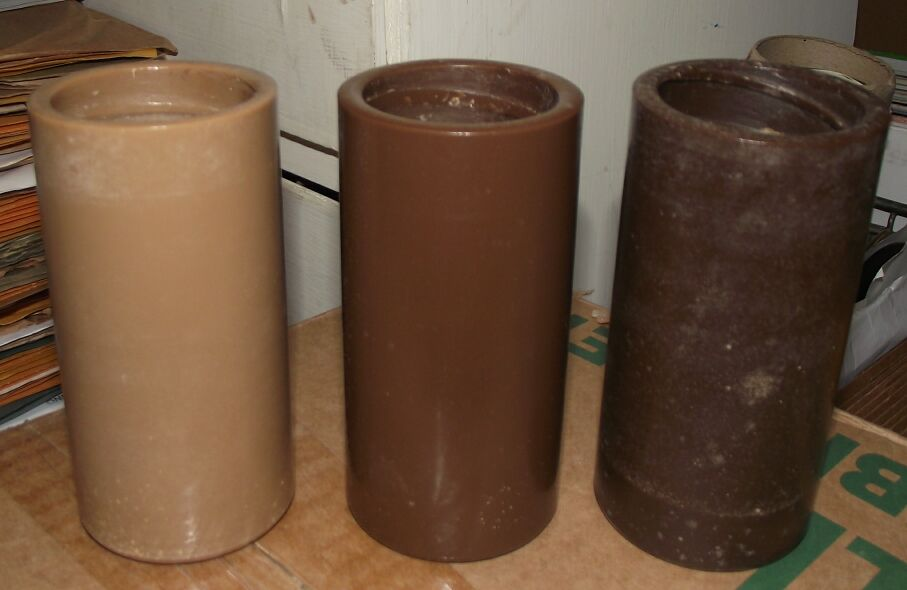
Brown wax cylinders showing various shades (and mold damage)

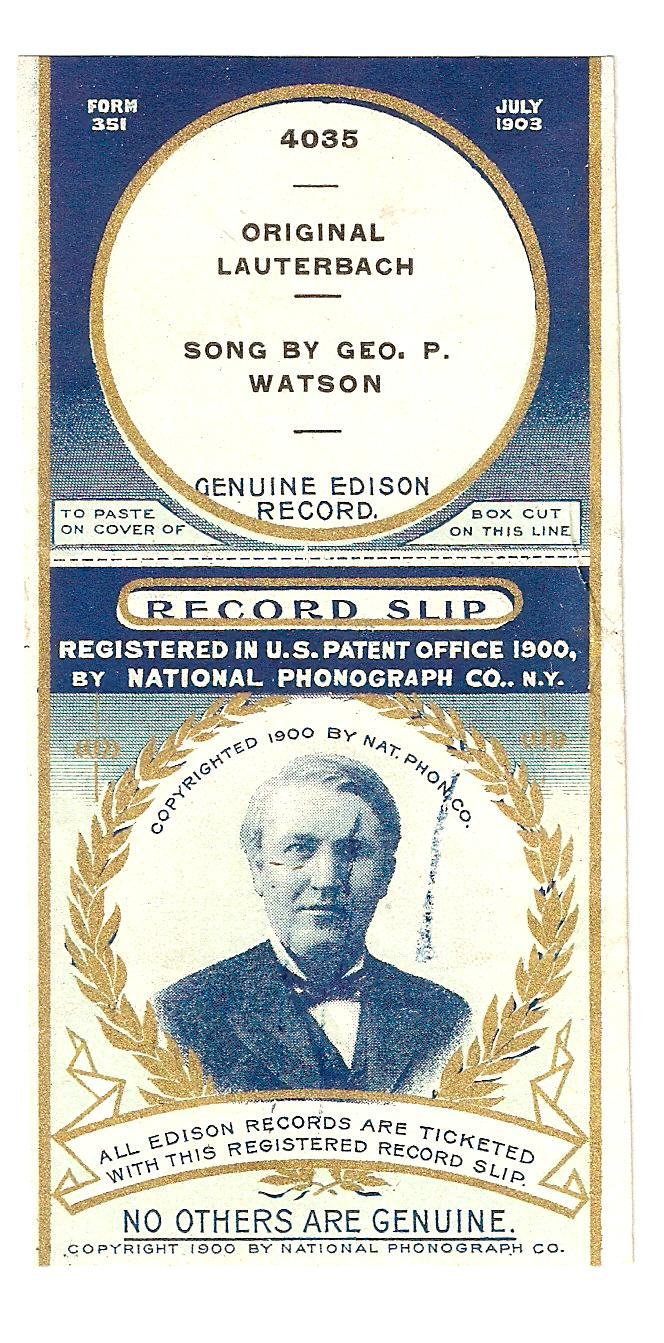
Paper record slip from 1903 cylinder

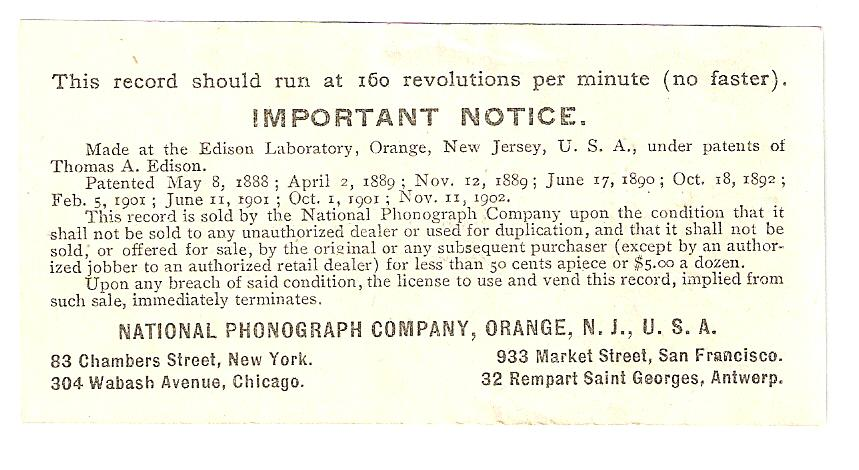
Back side of 1903 record slip

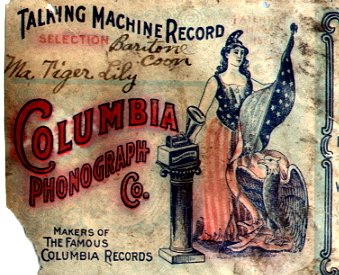
Portion of the label from the outside of a Columbia cylinder box, before 1901. Note that the title is handwritten.

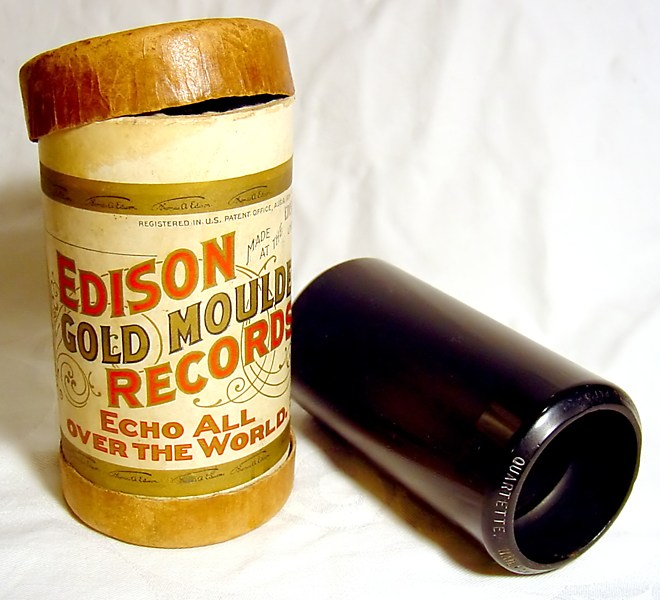
Edison Gold Moulded record made of relatively hard black wax, c. 1904

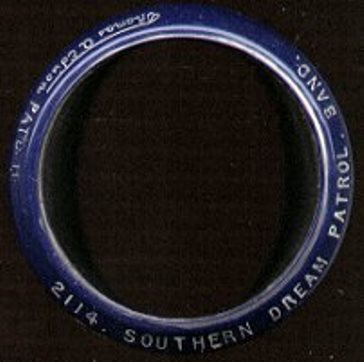
Rim of Edison "Blue Amberol" celluloid cylinder with plaster core

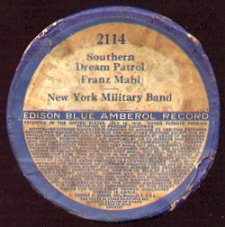
Blue Amberol cylinder box lid

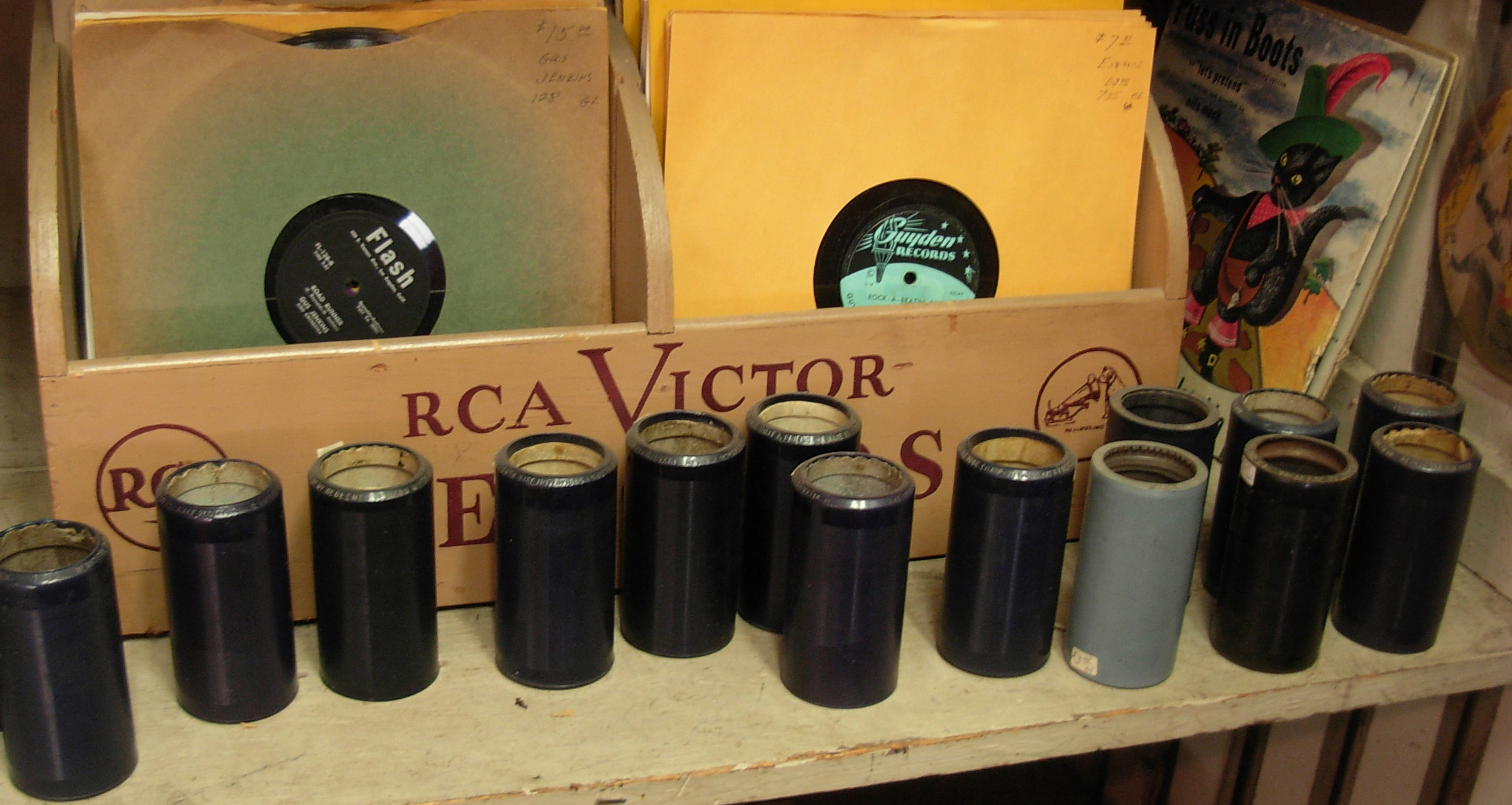
Disc records and cylinders

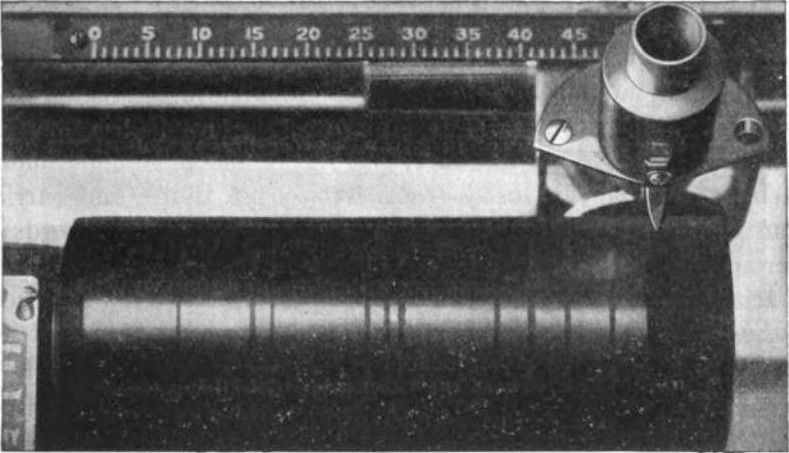
Cylinder on Dictaphone dictation machine (c. 1922). The recording head moved left to right. The black lines are shiny gaps between tracks. Each cylinder could record 1,200 to 1,500 words. They could be reused 100 to 120 times by putting them in a machine that erased them by shaving off the surface.

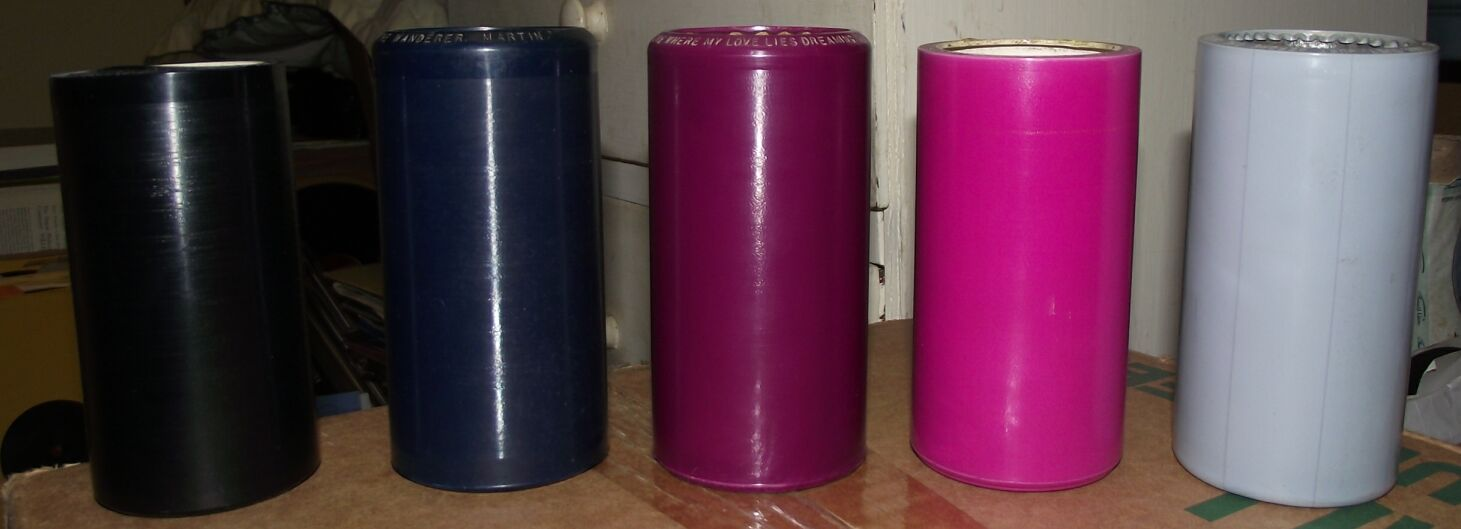
Celluloid phonograph cylinders displaying a variety of colors

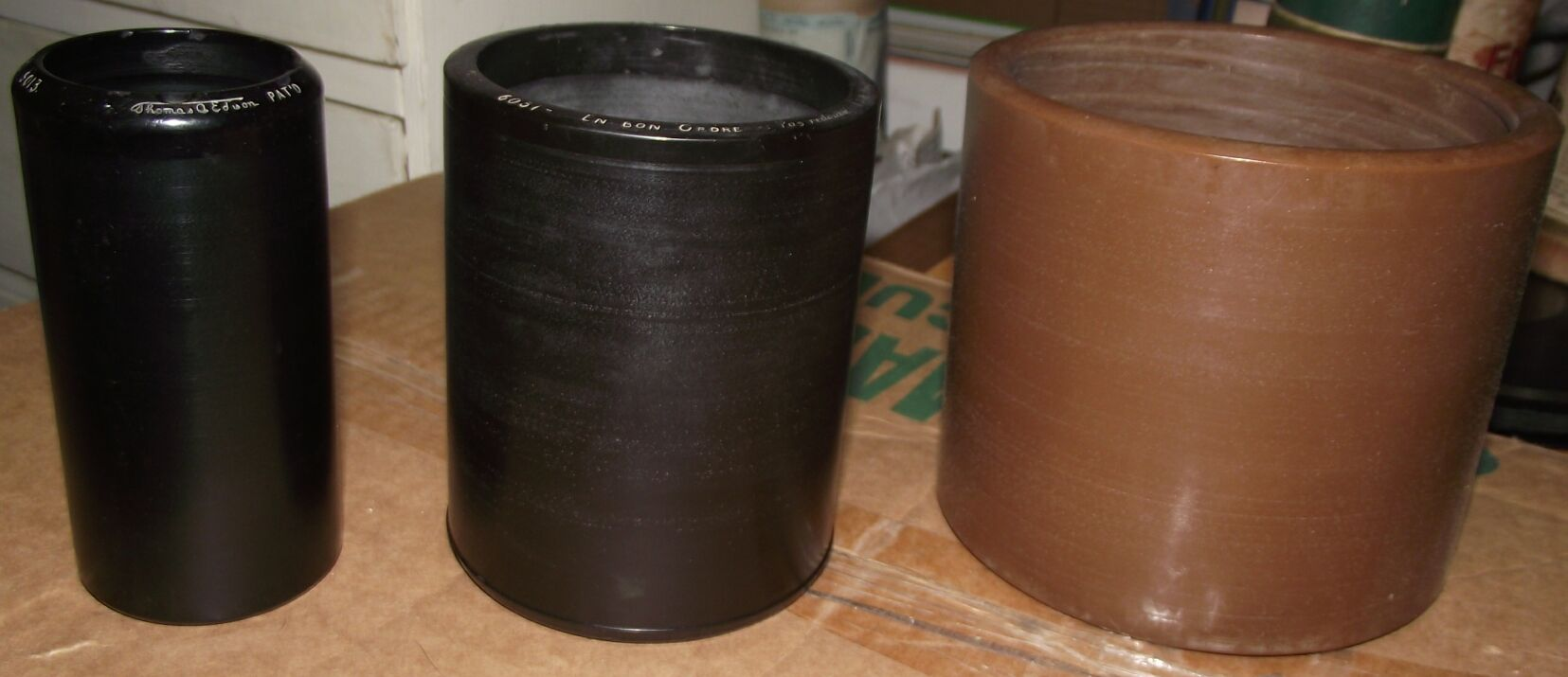
Wax phonograph cylinders in a variety of diameters

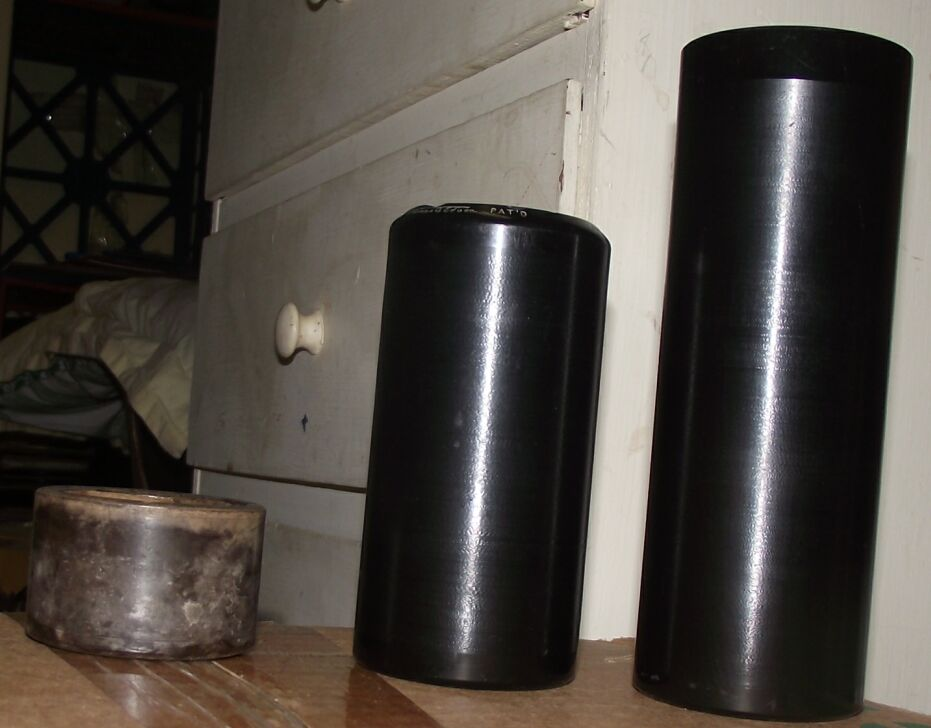
Wax phonograph cylinders in a variety of lengths

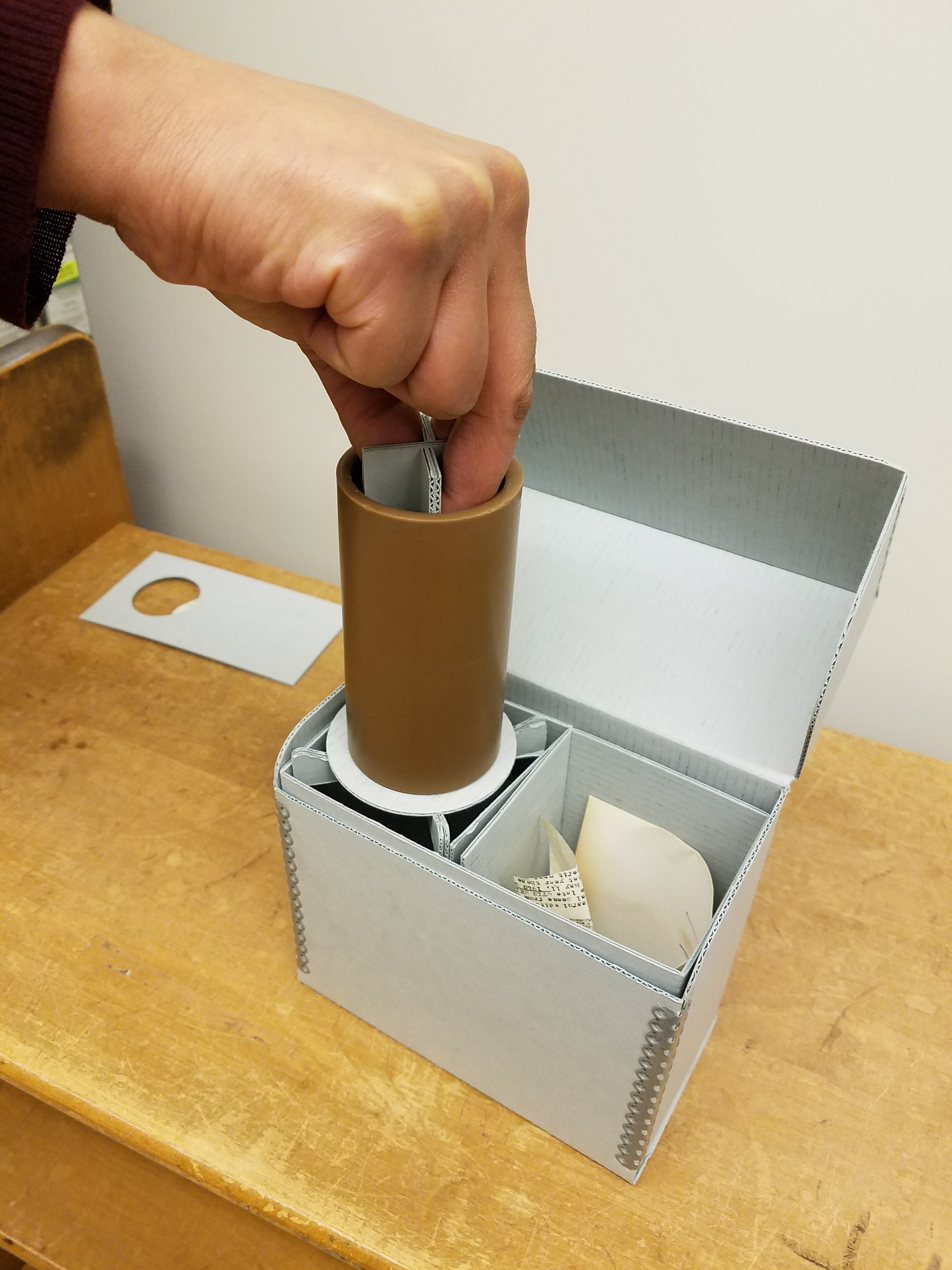
A sound engineer holds one of the Mapleson Cylinders containing a fragment of a live performance recorded at the Metropolitan Opera in 1901.

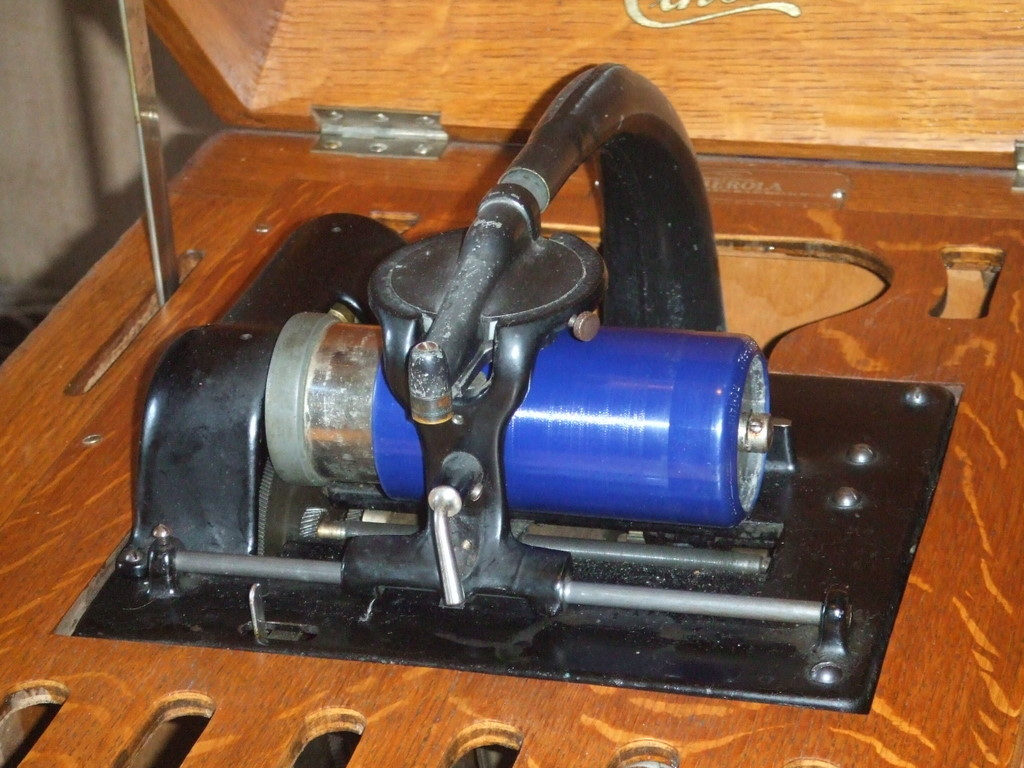
Close-up of the mechanism of an Edison Amberola, manufactured c. 1915

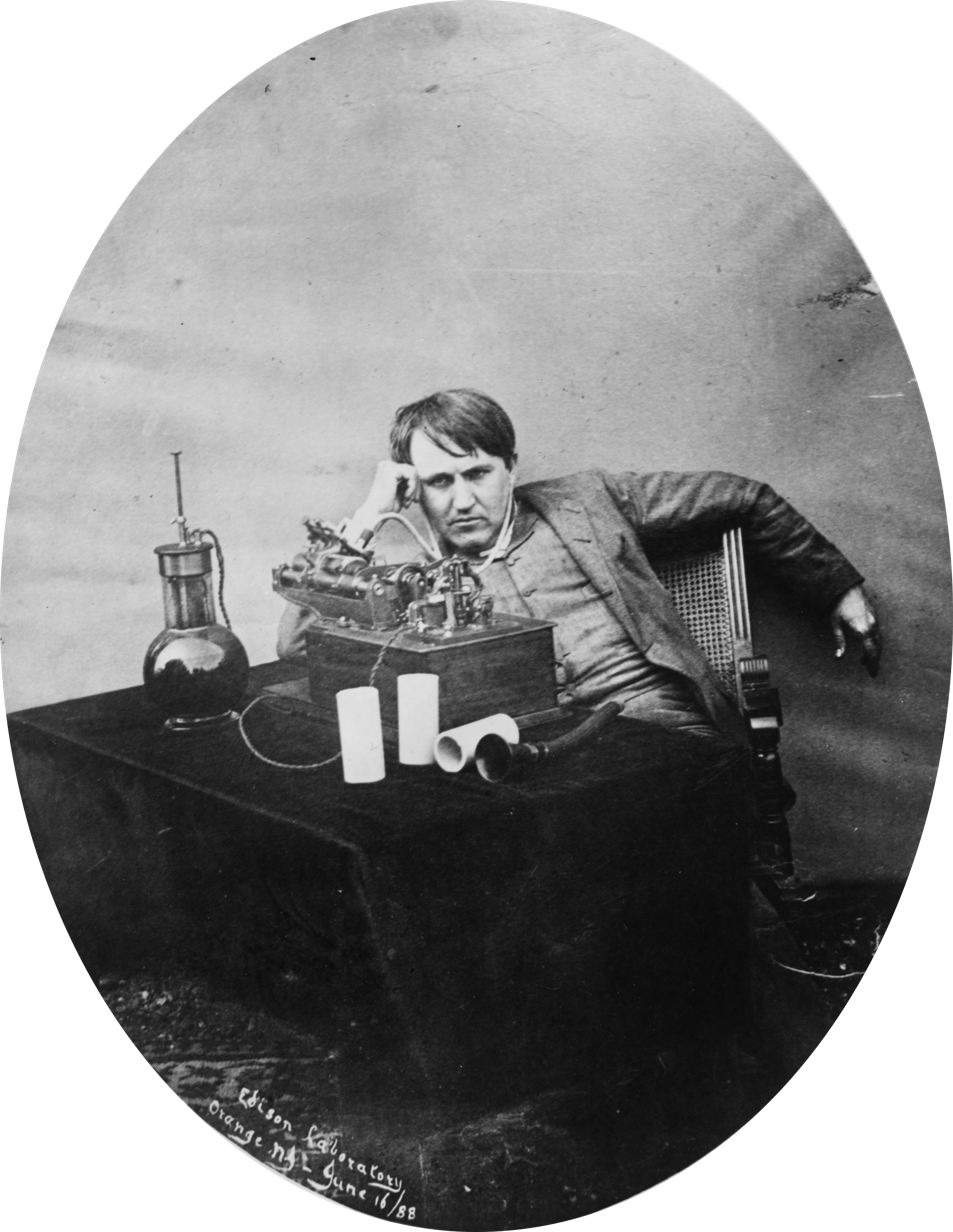
Thomas Edison in 1888 listening to a wax cylinder phonograph at the Edison laboratory, Orange, N.J.

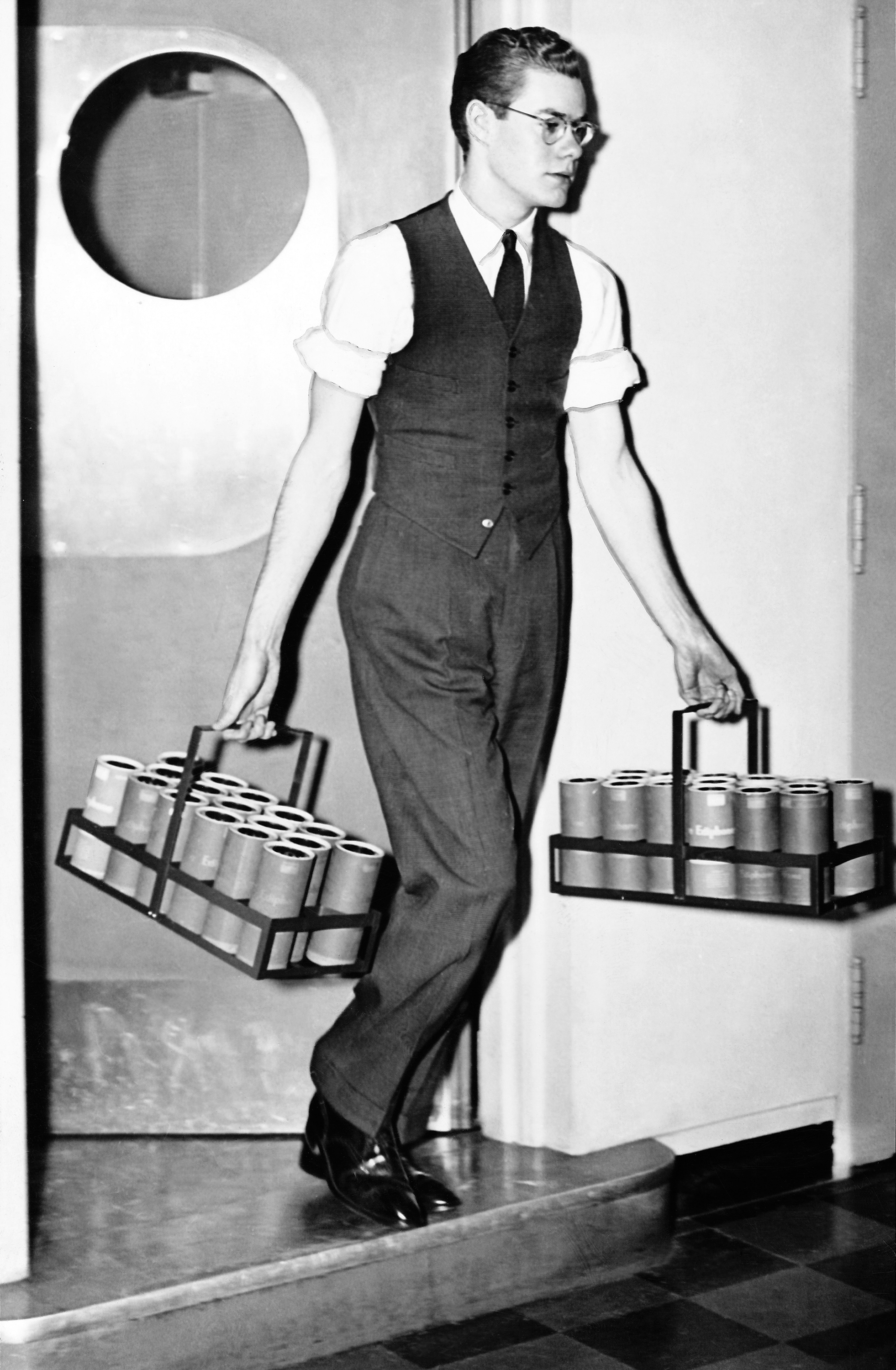
Delivering Ediphone wax cylinder recordings of propaganda broadcasts for analysis at the CBS listening post (May 1941)

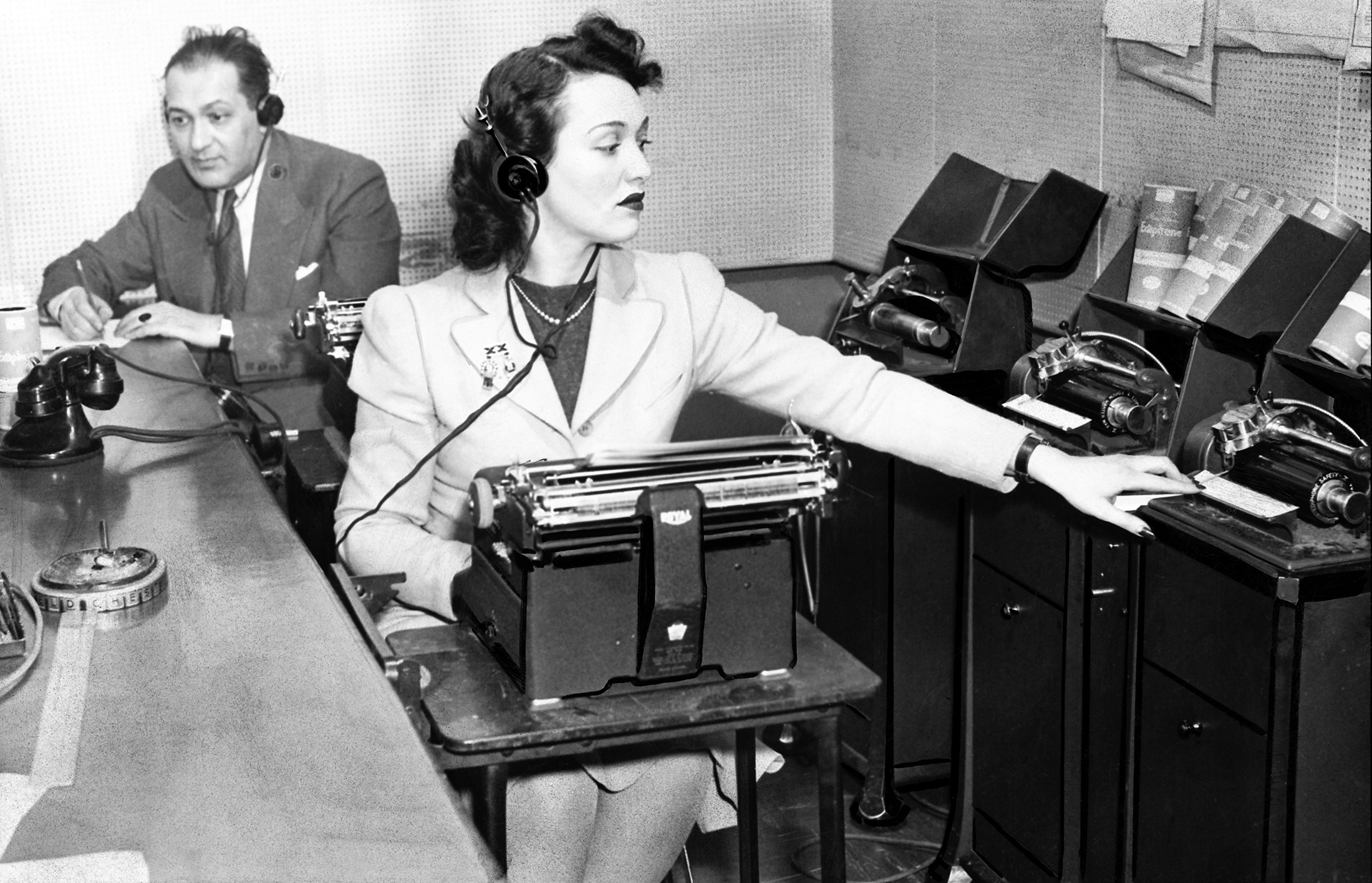
Transcribing propaganda broadcasts from Europe recorded on Ediphone cylinders at the CBS listening post (May 1941)

Playback demonstration of a recording and playback demonstration at the Thomas Edison National Historical Park in West Orange, New Jersey

Recording demonstration

== See also ==
- Archéophone
- Audio format
- Audio storage
- Cylinder Audio Archive
- Mapleson Cylinders
- Telediphone
- Volta Laboratory and Bureau
