= Cabinet Man =

Song by Lemon Demon

from the album Spirit Phone
- Released: February 29, 2016
- Genre: New wave; pop; synth-pop; synthpunk; electronic rock; electropop
- Length: 4:22
- Songwriter: Neil Cicierega
- Producer: Neil Cicierega

Audio
- "Cabinet Man" on YouTube

"Cabinet Man" is a song by American pop band Lemon Demon, a musical project created by American musician Neil Cicierega. It appears as track three of Lemon Demon's seventh studio album, Spirit Phone, which was released on February 29, 2016. The song was well received upon release, later appearing in the American television series Nancy Drew.

== Background ==
After working on Spirit Phone for four years, Cicierega released 11 previews of songs intended for the album in 2012. An instrumental "Cabinet Man" demo appears as the third song of this with different instrumentation and production from its final version. Later that year, Lemon Demon would go on to perform an early version of the song at the anime convention Youmacon. "Cabinet Man" was released on Spirit Phone on February 29, 2016, along with a pre-2012 demo of the song as a bonus track. The song's lyrics were inspired by Polybius, describing a man who fuses with an arcade machine and experiences adoration and abandonment before being destroyed. Cicierega described "Cabinet Man" in the album's 2018 commentary as "the kind of ludicrous story that would show up in an old horror anthology, like Creepshow". The song has since amassed over 65 million streams.

== Reception ==
The Daily Mississippian included the song on its 2023 Halloween playlist, with the 57th volume of The FuMP additionally including "Cabinet Man". It inspired the indie game Neon Nemesis, featured at the 2019 Alt.Ctrl.GDC Exhibition. The game is played by up to four racers, against a fifth player, the "nemesis" who controls their character from inside the arcade cabinet itself. "Cabinet Man" is featured multiple times in the TV series Nancy Drew, additionally playing during episode "The Warning of the Frozen Heart". During a proposal scene featuring the characters George and Nick, Ace holds a vinyl copy of Spirit Phone, proclaiming he found it at a thrift store. "Cabinet Man" appears as a recurring topic throughout the show, with a majority of characters enjoying the song.

== Personnel ==
- Neil Cicierega – vocals, instruments, programming, engineering, production
- Mark Kramer – remastering (Needlejuice pressings 2018-2021)
- Angel Marcloid – remastering (Needlejuice pressings 2022–)

== Charts ==
Weekly chart performance for "Cabinet Man"
Chart (2021)	Peak position
South Africa Top 100 Pop Songs	78
