= Dinosaurchestra =

Studio album by Lemon Demon
- Released: July 20, 2006
- Recorded: 2004–2006
- Genres: Pop; geek rock
- Length: 1:06:08
- Labels: Self-released; Needlejuice

Lemon Demon chronology
Damn Skippy (2005)	Dinosaurchestra (2006)	View-Monster (2008)

Neil Cicierega chronology
Damn Skippy (2005)	Dinosaurchestra (2006)	Circa 2000 (2007)

Singles from Dinosaurchestra
- 1. "Fine" Released: April 13, 2005; 2. "Action Movie Hero Boy" Released: May 19, 2005; 3. "Vow of Silence" Released: June 9, 2005; 4. "Lawnmower" Released: August 27, 2005; 5. "The Ultimate Showdown of Ultimate Destiny" Released: December 22, 2005

Dinosaurchestra is the fifth studio album by Lemon Demon, a musical project created by American musician Neil Cicierega. The album was released on July 20, 2006, with all tracks written, performed, and recorded by Neil Cicierega. The album received a generally positive reception and was successful, with the songs "Fine" and "The Ultimate Showdown of Ultimate Destiny" performing well on streaming services. In 2022, independent label Needlejuice Records remastered and re-released the album on vinyl, CD, cassette, and minidisc.

== Background ==
Shortly after the release of Lemon Demon's 2005 album Damn Skippy, Cicierega began releasing singles for Dinosaurchestra. "Fine" was released as the album's first single on April 13, appearing as an MP3 download on Lemon Demon's website alongside the song "Samuel and Rosella". Throughout the year, more singles were released, including "The Ultimate Showdown of Ultimate Destiny" on December 22, 2005. Dinosaurchestra was released digitally and on CD on July 20, 2006. It received a remastered physical release on vinyl, CD, and cassette by Needlejuice Records on January 1, 2022, followed by a minidisc release in November 2022. A wax cylinder single was released for the bonus track "The Oldest Man on MySpace" in May 2023.

== Reception ==
The Boston Globe complimented Cicierega's creativity on the album, likening his lyricism to They Might Be Giants' style. Bandcamp Daily described the tracks as "consistently engaging" and highlighted the album's coverage of alternative rock, intelligent dance music, and new wave music. Dayton Daily News praised the music video of "The Ultimate Showdown of Ultimate Destiny", calling it "the latest hot thing". Salon similarly lauded the video, reviewing that "if the catchy chorus is running through your head, don't say we didn't warn you". Dr. Demento called the track the "#1 song of 2006 thus far".

== Commercial performance ==
In an interview with Toronto Star, Cicierega revealed that the album had been a commercial success for him, selling enough CDs to financially support his career. Upon release, "The Ultimate Showdown of Ultimate Destiny" would be Lemon Demon's highest-streamed song on Spotify until 2020, overtaken by "Touch-Tone Telephone". "Fine" became a trending song on TikTok in late 2022, subsequently becoming Lemon Demon's most popular song with 124 million streams by 2025.

== Track listing ==
All tracks are written, performed, and recorded by Neil Cicierega (on streaming services, "Eyewishes" and "Bystanding" are combined into one song).

No.	Title	Length
1.	"Dinosaurchestra Part One"	1:50
2.	"Action Movie Hero Boy"	3:42
3.	"Fine"	4:25
4.	"Lawnmower"	3:09
5.	"Stuck"	4:15
6.	"The Ultimate Showdown of Ultimate Destiny"	3:36
7.	"Vow of Silence"	3:09
8.	"Neverending Hum"	2:57
9.	"Dinosaurchestra Part Two"	1:02
10.	"Your Imaginary Friend"	3:43
11.	"Archaeopteryx"	4:51
12.	"Eyewishes"	2:19
13.	"Bystanding"	0:44
14.	"Indie Cindy & the Lo-Fi Lullabies"	2:43
15.	"Nothing Worth Loving Isn't Askew"	3:50
16.	"This Hyper World"	3:55
17.	"Deep in the Ocean"	5:16
18.	"Dinosaurchestra Part Three"	5:33
19.	"The Too Much Song"	5:09
Total length:		66:08

=== 2006 bonus tracks ===
The 2006 issue of the album contained 16 bonus tracks in the HTML file; consisting of demos, cut songs, and remixes of The Ultimate Showdown of Ultimate Destiny. An additional HTML file on the CD contained bonus tracks, lyrics, a commentary app, and a special thanks.

No.	Title	Length
1.	"White Bread Boyfriend"	3:45
2.	"Funniest"	1:14
3.	"Birthday (Alligators and Pretzel Makers)"	3:37
4.	"Chips's Challenge chip01 midi remix"	0:36
5.	"It Can Get Lonely in My Mansion"	2:29
6.	"Samuel and Rosella"	4:49
7.	"Bill Watterson (Demo)"	1:00
8.	"Space Mission Alpha"	1:01
9.	"Being Alone on Valentine's Day"	1:26
10.	"Stick Stickly"	2:04
11.	"Abraham Lincoln's Head"	2:15
12.	"The Next Dimension"	3:59
13.	"Princess Unicorn Bunny Kitten Angel"	0:16
14.	"The Ultimate Showdown (Aaron Ackerson remix)"	3:33
15.	"The Ultimate Showdown (>SaTIst< remix)"	3:56
16.	"The Ultimate Showdown (R-Forrest remix)"	4:00
Total length:		106:08

=== 2022 remaster bonus tracks ===
The 2022 remaster of the album adds 8 new bonus tracks; which consist of stems and unreleased music around the time. The remastered vinyl and cassette releases contain the first nine numbered bonus tracks and all physical releases include a download card for the full album and an HTML commentary by Cicierega, except for the CD release, which already has the full album and commentary.

No.	Title	Length
0.	"dino.mp3"	0:10
1.	"Birthday (Alligators and Pretzel Makers)"	3:37
2.	"White Bread Boyfriend"	3:46
3.	"Stick Stickly"	2:04
4.	"Being Alone on Valentine's Day"	1:27
5.	"It Can Get Lonely in My Mansion"	2:32
6.	"Princess Unicorn Bunny Kitten Angel"	0:18
7.	"The Next Dimension"	3:59
8.	"Samuel and Rosella"	4:49
9.	"Abraham Lincoln's Head"	2:16
10.	"Space Mission Alpha"	1:01
11.	"Funniest"	1:14
12.	"Chip's Challenge Chip01 MIDI Remix"	0:37
13.	"Bill Watterson (Demo)"	1:01
14.	"Indie Cindy and the Lo-Fi Lullabies (Demo)"	2:49
15.	"Every Time You Stifle a Sneeze"	4:22
16.	"Snakes on a Plane"	0:46
17.	"The Oldest Man on MySpace"	2:49
18.	"The Ultimate Showdown of Ultimate Destiny (Aaron Ackerson Remix)"	3:33
19.	"The Ultimate Showdown of Ultimate Destiny (R-Forrest Remix)"	4:00
20.	"The Ultimate Showdown of Ultimate Destiny (SaTist Remix)"	3:57
21.	"The Ultimate Showdown of Ultimate Destiny (Instrumental)"	3:33
22.	"The Ultimate Showdown of Ultimate Destiny (Vocals)"	3:26
23.	"Fine (Instrumental)"	4:41
24.	"This Hyper World (Instrumental)"	3:58
Total length:		132:53

== Personnel ==
- Neil Cicierega – vocals, instruments, programming, engineering, production, cover artwork
- Alora Lanzillotta – bass ("Samuel and Rosella")
- Angel Marcloid – remastering (Needlejuice pressings 2022–)
