= Touch-Tone Telephone =

2016 song by Lemon Demon

- Cover art of the 2023 single

Single by Lemon Demon

from the album Spirit Phone
- Released: February 29, 2016 (album); May 23, 2023 (single)
- Genre: Synth-pop; orchestral; geek rock; progressive pop; electropop
- Length: 4:42
- Songwriter: Neil Cicierega
- Producer: Neil Cicierega

Licensed audio
- "Touch-Tone Telephone" on YouTube

"Touch-Tone Telephone" is a song by Lemon Demon, a musical project created by American musician Neil Cicierega. It was released on February 29, 2016, as the second track of Lemon Demon's seventh studio album, Spirit Phone, and as a wax cylinder single on May 23, 2023.

== Background ==
In 2009, Cicierega produced a demo titled "Ivanushka", based on the plot of the film Jack Frost. This demo would later be adapted into "Touch-Tone Telephone". Following four years of development, 11 previews of songs intended for Spirit Phone were showcased in 2012, with "Touch-Tone Telephone" featured as the unnamed penultimate song. The song would release on Spirit Phone on February 29, 2016. In Spirit Phone's commentary, Cicierega states that the song's perspective is from "a dedicated caller into a radio show who has it all figured out", calling it a "big rant of preemptive defensiveness and saying you're going to do something without ever doing it".

== Composition ==
"Touch-Tone Telephone" is an uptempo new wave song. It instrumentally features strings, bass, drums, synth, and keytar, with the Collegian describing its "whimsical sound" as reminiscent of Lemon Demon's fourth studio album, Damn Skippy (2005). The song's hook contains embellishments of piano and violin underneath Cicierega singing the song's title, with the bridge using a phone ringing sound effect to set up a crescendo into the final chorus. Following the lyrical end of the song, "Touch-Tone Telephone" closes with a minute of experimental synthesizers, described by the Vector as "melting into space". Cicierega composed this portion to decompress the song and create a soundscape that transitions into "Cabinet Man".

== Music video ==
A music video for "Touch-Tone Telephone" directed by Chris Spargo was released on October 30, 2020. The video stars Tom Wohlfahrt, who dances and acts out the song's lyrics in a room with an evidence board, a push-button telephone, and a projector. After the creation of the video's concept, filming took four days and production took three weeks, intending to match its close release date to Halloween with the paranormal themes of Spirit Phone. Initially released unofficially, it later received approval from Cicierega to represent the song in film festivals.

=== Awards and nominations ===
Year	Award	Category	Nominee(s)	Result	Ref.
2021	Oxford Film Festival	Best Music Video	"Touch-Tone Telephone"	Won	
2021	Birmingham Film Festival	Best Music Video	"Touch-Tone Telephone"	Nominated	
2021	Cinequest Film & Creativity Festival	Best Music Video	"Touch-Tone Telephone"	Nominated	

== Reception ==
Mashable included "Touch-Tone Telephone" on their 2019 Halloween playlist, calling the song one of many "real gems". It additionally received inclusion on McDonald's "Grimace's Birthday" playlist. "Touch-Tone Telephone" has amassed over 100 million streams across Spotify and YouTube.

== Personnel ==
- Neil Cicierega – vocals, instruments, programming, engineering, production
- Mark Kramer – remastering (Needlejuice pressings 2018-2021)
- Angel Marcloid – remastering (Needlejuice pressings 2022–)
- Ming Doyle – cover artwork
