= Nature Tapes =

2014 EP by Lemon Demon

EP by Lemon Demon
- Released: March 24, 2014
- Recorded: 2010–2013
- Genre: Pop; alternative; comedy rock
- Length: 25:51
- Label: Needlejuice Records
- Producer: Neil Cicierega

Lemon Demon chronology
I Am Become Christmas (2012)	Nature Tapes (2014)	Spirit Phone (2016)

Neil Cicierega chronology
I Am Become Christmas (2012)	Nature Tapes (2014)	Mouth Sounds (2014)

Singles from Nature Tapes
- 1. "Brodyquest" Released: June 1, 2010; 2. "Really Cool Wig" Released: November 19, 2011; 3. "A Mask of My Own Face" Released: October 18, 2012; 4. "My Trains" Released: January 23, 2013; 5. "Two Trucks" Released: May 3, 2013; 6. "Everybody Loves Raymond" Released: October 28, 2013; 7. "Jaws" Released: December 31, 2013

Nature Tapes is the third EP by Lemon Demon, a musical project created by American musician Neil Cicierega. It was independently released on March 24, 2014, though all songs on its tracklist were released prior as singles. It later had physical distribution in 2019 by Needlejuice Records. Nature Tapes received favorable to mixed reviews upon release, supported by the viral status of "Brodyquest" and "Two Trucks".

== Background ==
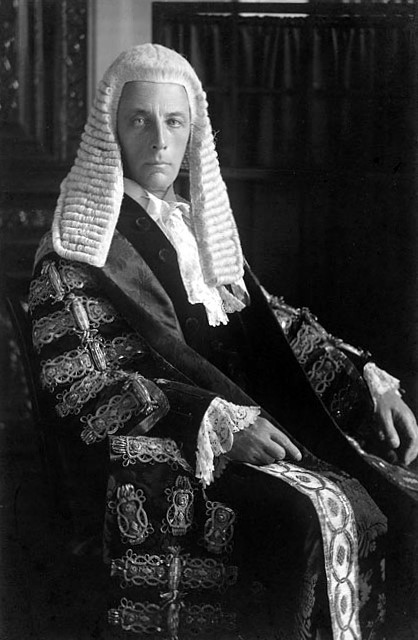
Cover for "Really Cool Wig", depicting Stanley Buckmaster wearing his judicial wig as part of court dress.

While Cicierega worked on his seventh studio album, Spirit Phone, he released various songs that would not appear on the album as singles between 2010 and 2013. On June 1, 2010, Cicierega released a video and single titled "Brodyquest" (stylized BRODYQUEST) on his main YouTube channel which pictured actor Adrien Brody going about his daily life in a comedic manner. "Really Cool Wig" was released as a single on November 18, 2011, followed by "A Mask of My Own Face" on October 18, 2012. All three singles were performed live in November 2012 at the anime convention Youmacon alongside other Lemon Demon songs, including "Goosebumps".

In 2013, Lemon Demon released four singles: "My Trains" on January 23, "Two Trucks" on May 3, "Everybody Loves Raymond" on October 28, and "Jaws" on December 31. "Everybody Loves Raymond" originated as a MIDI demo created by Cicierega in 1998, making the song the longest developed by the band. All seven singles were condensed into an EP to clean up his Bandcamp page, which was released as Nature Tapes on March 24, 2014. The EP was issued on vinyl, CD, and cassette in 2019 through independent label Needlejuice Records, and later had a MiniDisc release in 2020. This re-issue retroactively added the singles "Goosebumps" and "Sexy DVD". Both singles were released with music videos, with the former on May 30, 2011, and the latter on April 13, 2010.

== Reception ==
"Brodyquest" became a viral video upon release. Stephen Colbert would bring up the video during his interview with Adrien Brody in a 2016 episode of The Late Show with Stephen Colbert. When interviewed by Jacob Shamsian of Entertainment Weekly, Brody mentioned that he was originally shown the video by his father and made it his ringtone for a short period. Jonathan Dean of The Times and Ian Wang of Varsity also praised "Brodyquest", while the video was also featured on Polygon's list of the greatest achievements in dumb internet video. The song was added to the rhythm game Rock Band on March 30, 2012.

"Two Trucks" became an internet meme for its humorous depiction of sexual activity between pickup trucks, amassing 50 million streams. The track was included at number eight on Vox's 2020 quarantine playlist, and has also appeared in drag shows. In a retrospective review of Nature Tapes, music critic Anthony Fantano commended the EP's songwriting but found its production and mixing to be raw and untouched.

== Track listing ==
All tracks are written by Neil Cicierega. Physical releases additionally include a download card for the EP and remixing stems for every song except "Sexy DVD", except for the CD release which already has the full EP and stems.

Nature Tapes track listing
No.	Title	Length
1.	"Really Cool Wig"	2:38
2.	"Two Trucks"	4:07
3.	"A Mask of My Own Face"	3:30
4.	"Everybody Loves Raymond"	3:35
5.	"Jaws"	4:10
6.	"My Trains"	4:04
7.	"Brodyquest"	3:47
Total length:		25:51

Needlejuice re-issue track listing
No.	Title	Length
0.	"Sexy DVD"	1:29
1.	"Really Cool Wig"	2:39
2.	"Two Trucks"	4:04
3.	"A Mask of My Own Face"	3:31
4.	"Everybody Loves Raymond"	3:37
5.	"Goosebumps"	2:32
6.	"Jaws"	4:09
7.	"My Trains"	4:04
8.	"Brodyquest"	3:48
Total length:		29:53

== Personnel ==
Credits adapted from the album's liner notes.

- Neil Cicierega – vocals, instruments, programming, engineering, production, artwork
- Mark Kramer – remastering (Needlejuice pressings 2019–2021)
- Angel Marcloid – remastering (Needlejuice pressings beginning in 2022)
