= The Ultimate Showdown of Ultimate Destiny =

- Still from the official music video for "The Ultimate Showdown of Ultimate Destiny", featuring an array of characters from across pop culture

Single by Lemon Demon

from the album Dinosaurchestra
- Released: December 22, 2005
- Genre: Novelty; comedy rock
- Length: 3:36
- Label: Self-released; Needlejuice
- Songwriter: Neil Cicierega
- Producer: Neil Cicierega

Lemon Demon singles chronology
"Stick Stickly" (2005)	"The Ultimate Showdown of Ultimate Destiny" (2005)	"Snakes on a Plane" (2006)

Music video
- "The Ultimate Showdown of Ultimate Destiny" on Newgrounds
- "The Ultimate Showdown" on YouTube

"The Ultimate Showdown of Ultimate Destiny", often shortened to "The Ultimate Showdown", is a comical song and video released on December 22, 2005. The song was written and performed by Neil Cicierega under the pseudonym Lemon Demon, appearing as the fifth single of the project's fifth studio album Dinosaurchestra. The song describes a massive and citywide battle set in Tokyo started by Godzilla and Batman, expanding to include countless historical and pop-culture icons and ultimately lasting for a century. The music video's animation was made by Shawn Vulliez.

== Background ==
In the early 2000s, Neil Cicierega popularized animutation, a form of flash animation that comedically depicts pop-culture images set to upbeat music. Steven Lerner, the owner of Albino Blacksheep, later stated that as the genre grew more popular it had begun to advance in effort, with creators drawing the characters rather than editing publicly available photos. Cicierega adapted to this development, publishing the song "The Ultimate Showdown" to Newgrounds on December 22, 2005, with Shawn Vulliez credited for the video's animation under the name altffour. The song was additionally released under the full name "The Ultimate Showdown of Ultimate Destiny" as the fifth single of Lemon Demon's fifth studio album Dinosaurchestra, which came out on July 20, 2006.

== Reception ==
"The Ultimate Showdown of Ultimate Destiny" gained a large cult following among web enthusiasts. It ranked on Newgrounds as the "User's Choice" upon publication, amassing 6.5 million views within its first six months of release. It appeared on several other websites including Albino Blacksheep and YouTube, receiving over 25 million views on the latter before a takedown and replacement by Vulliez in early 2021. A higher resolution fan upload has received over 10 million views on YouTube as of 2025. The song topped the "Funny Five" on The Dr. Demento Show for several weeks and was the #1 request for 2006. In 2009, the song was re-recorded with a full band, receiving inclusion on the compilation Almanac 2009 and Lemon Demon's first EP Live (Only Not) (2011). It additionally appeared on the Rock Band Network, releasing to the service on July 6, 2010. On October 22, 2021, for the 15th anniversary, a Multi-Animator Project to create a new version of the original video, set to the RBN Mix was released with a greater amount of characters included.

== Plot ==
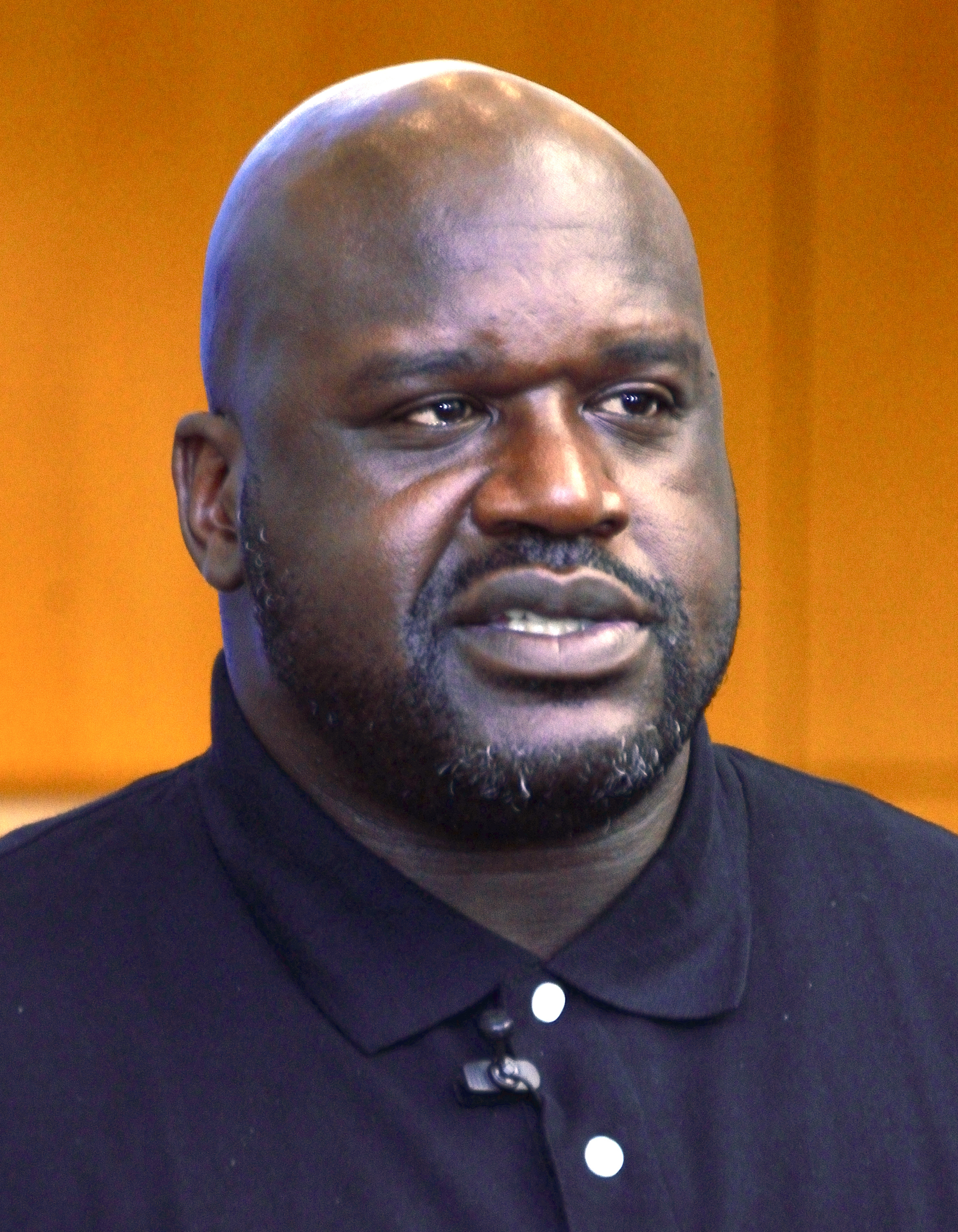
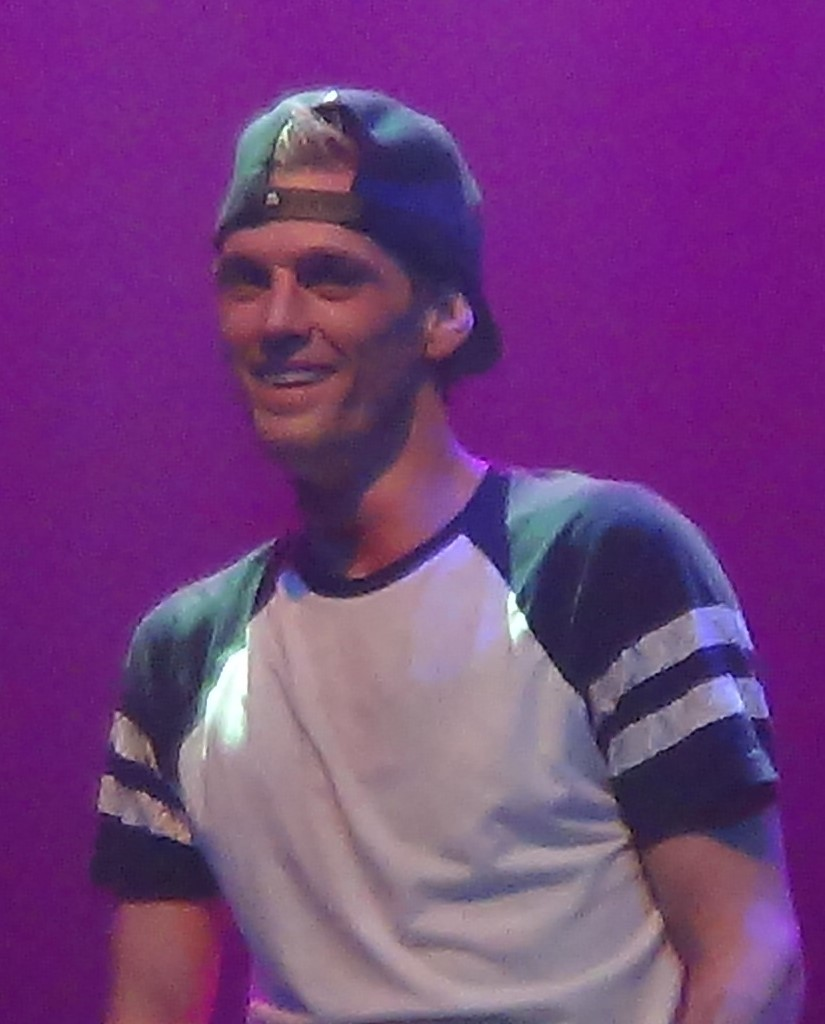
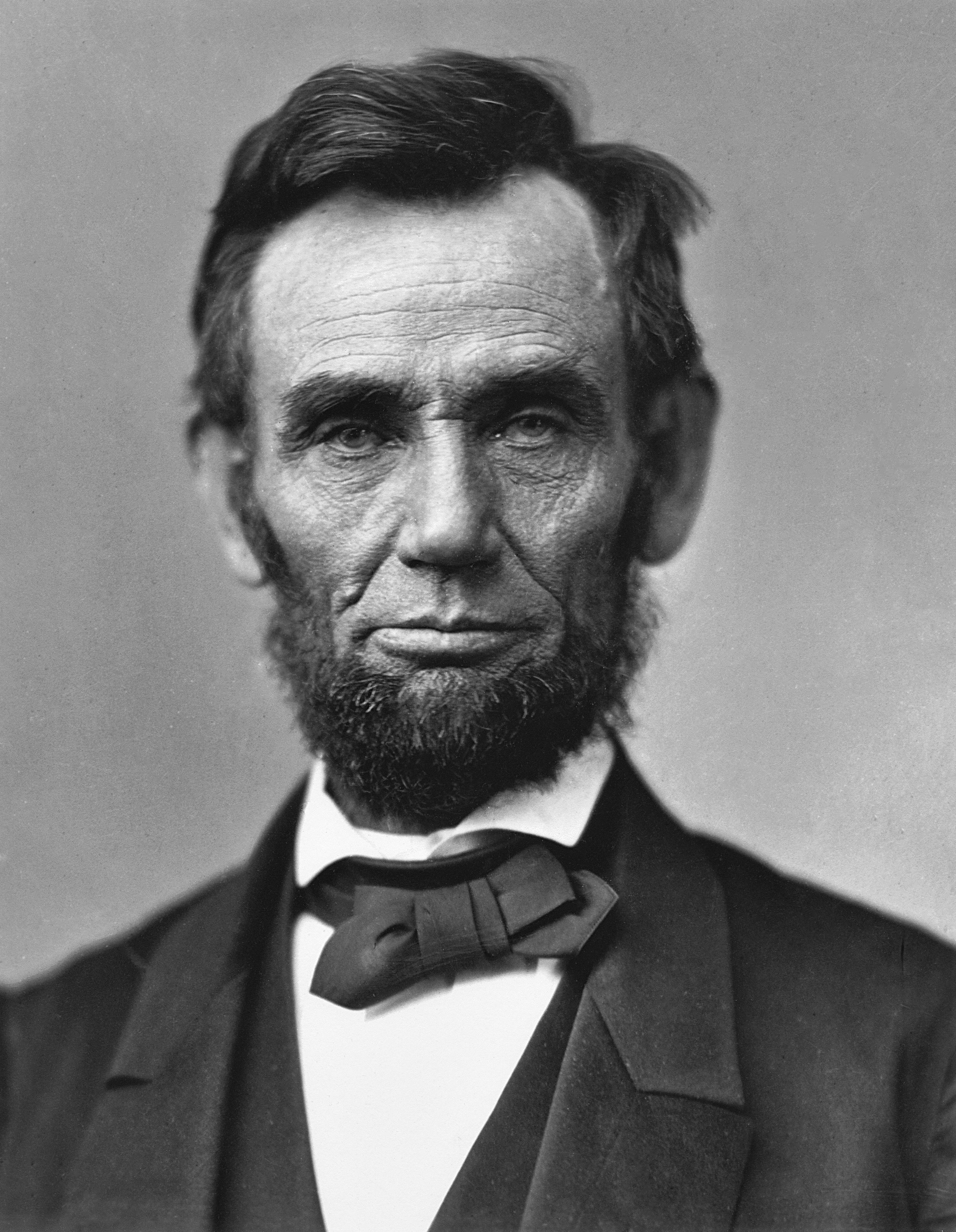
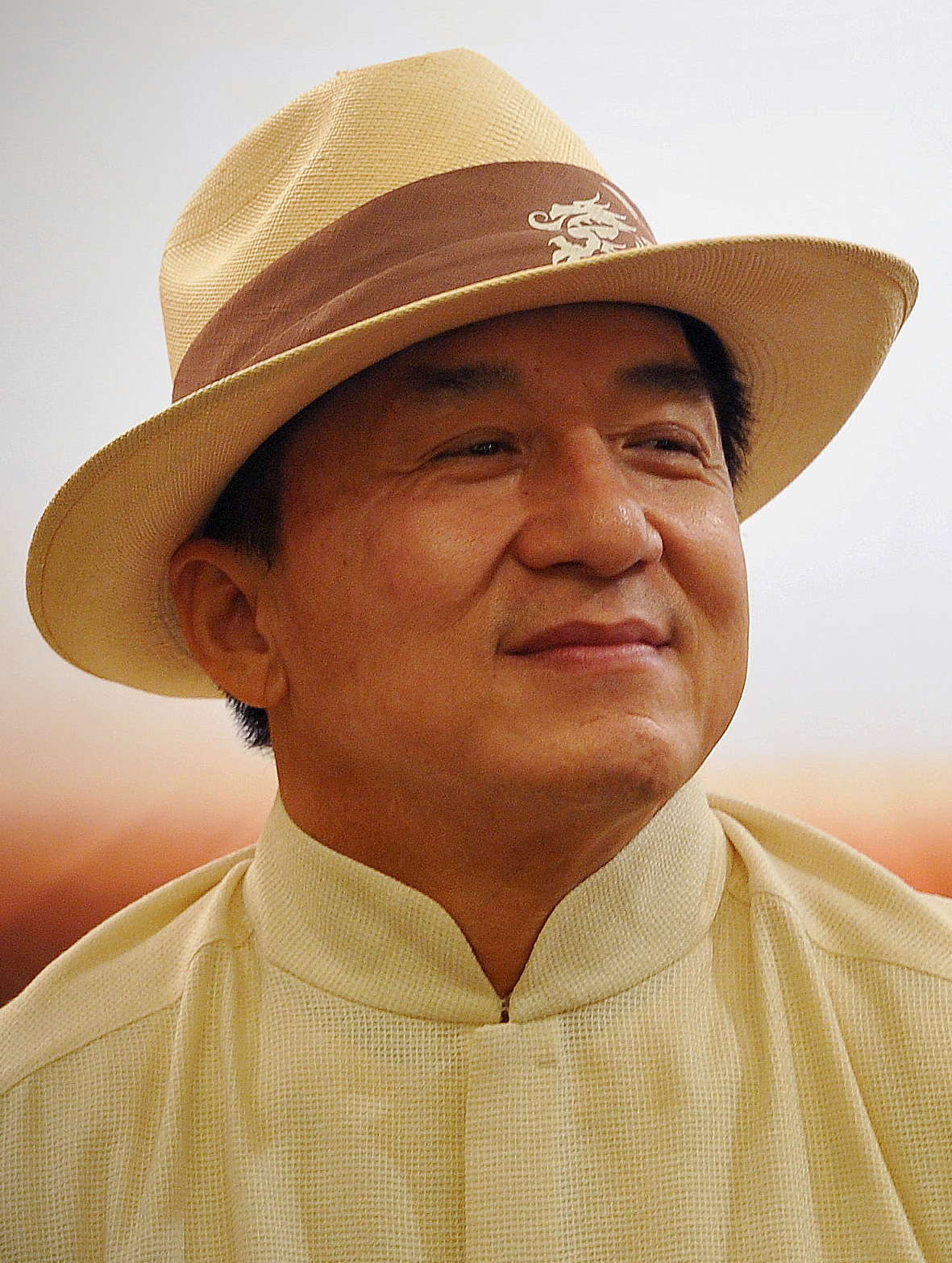
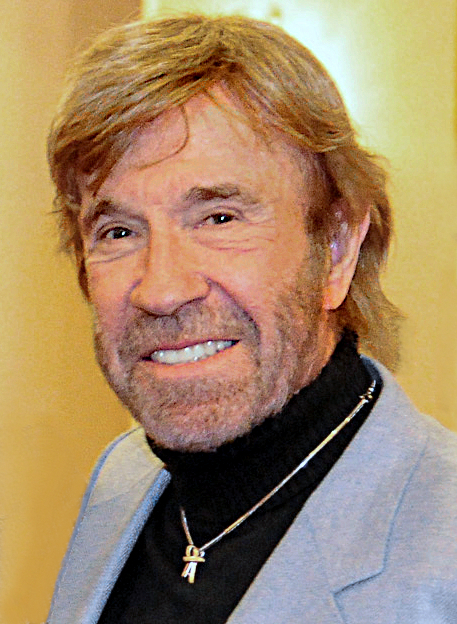
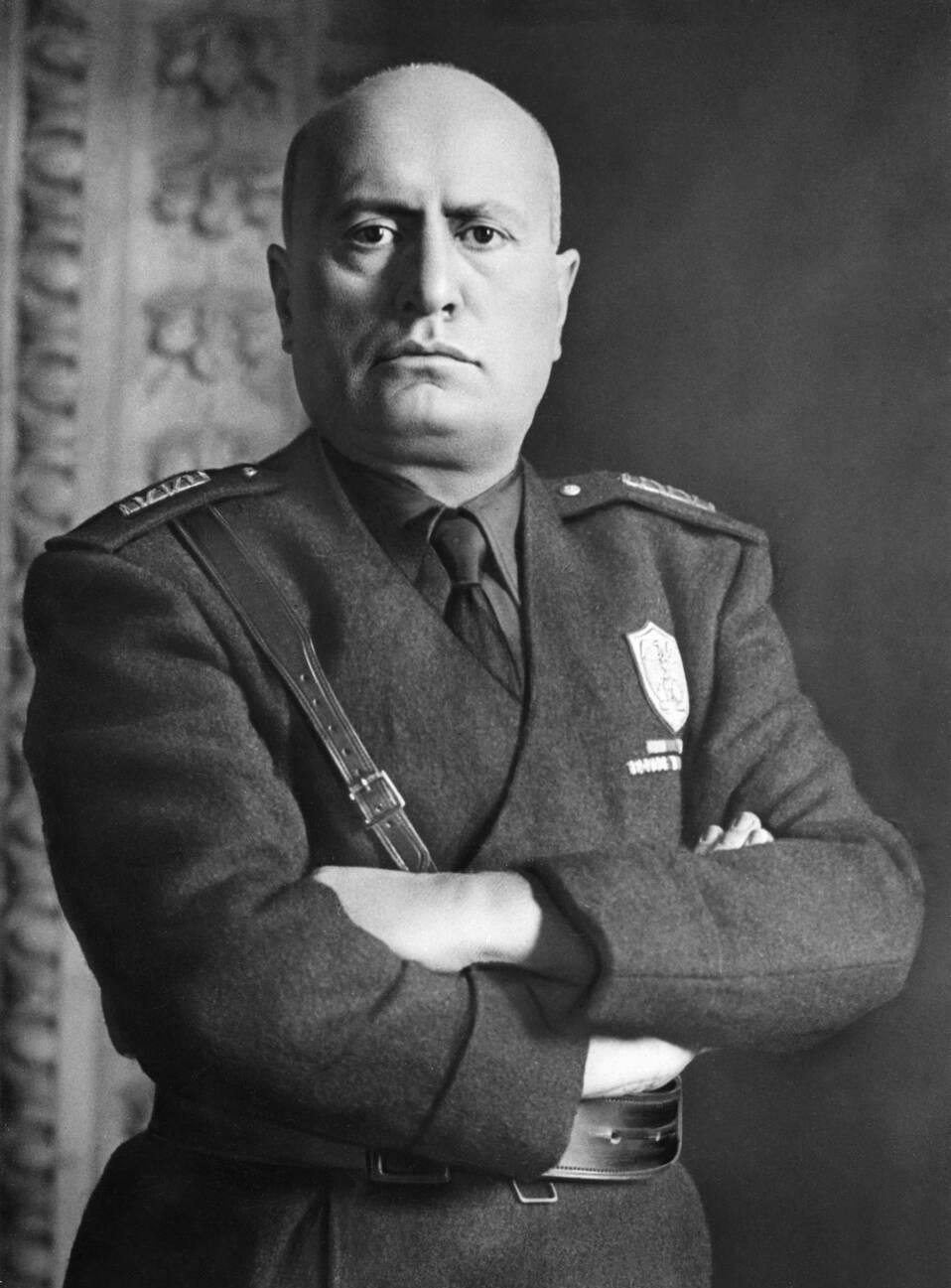
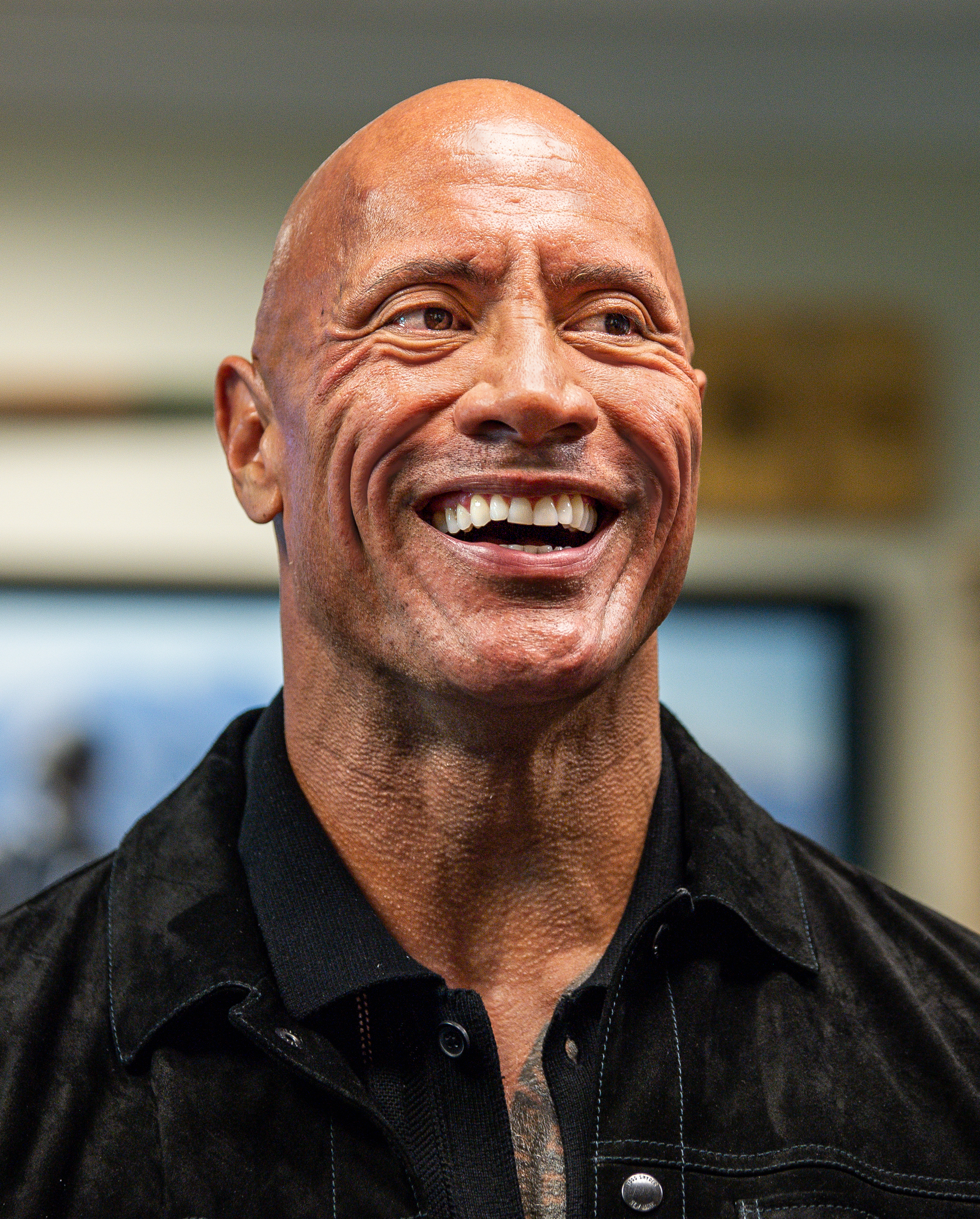
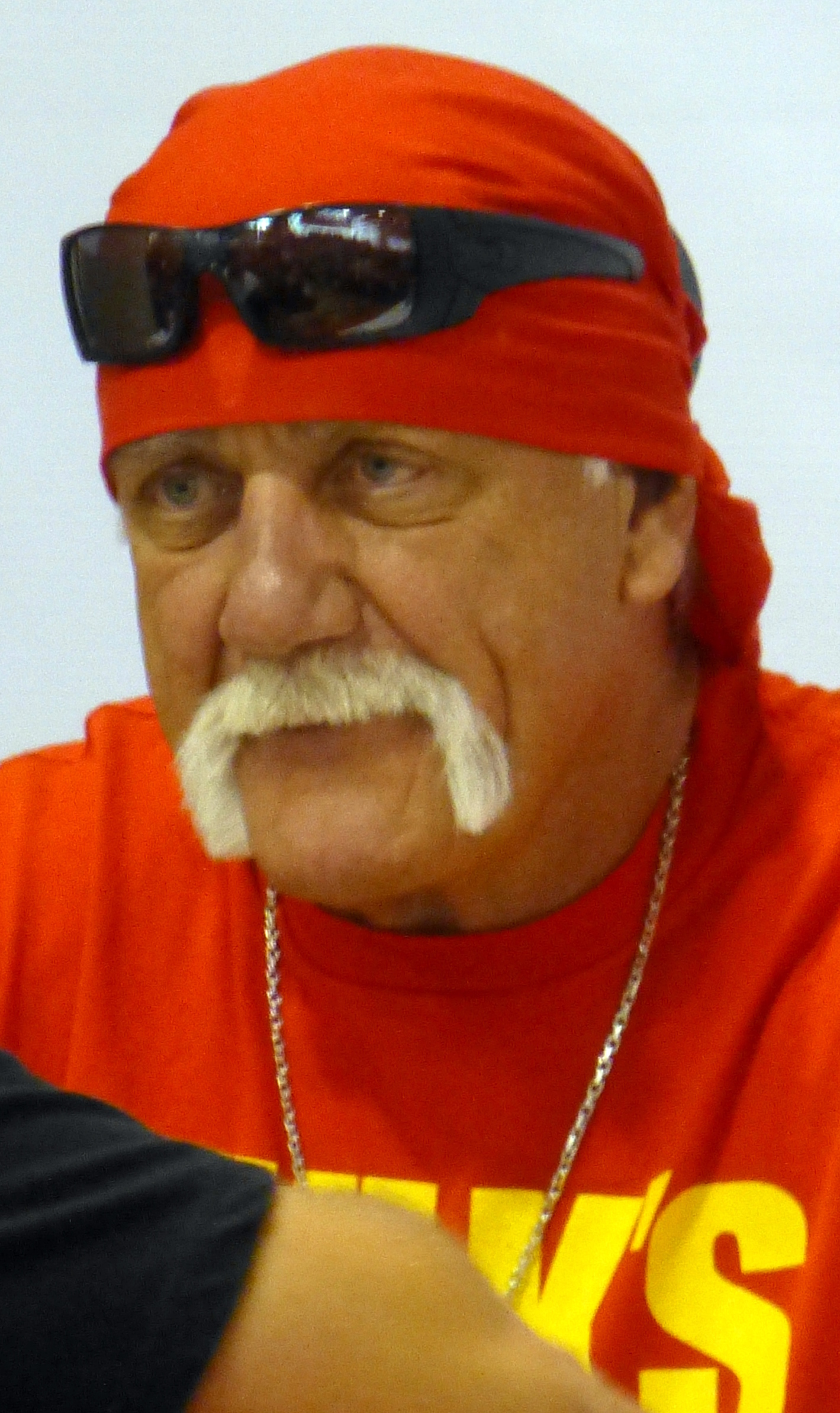
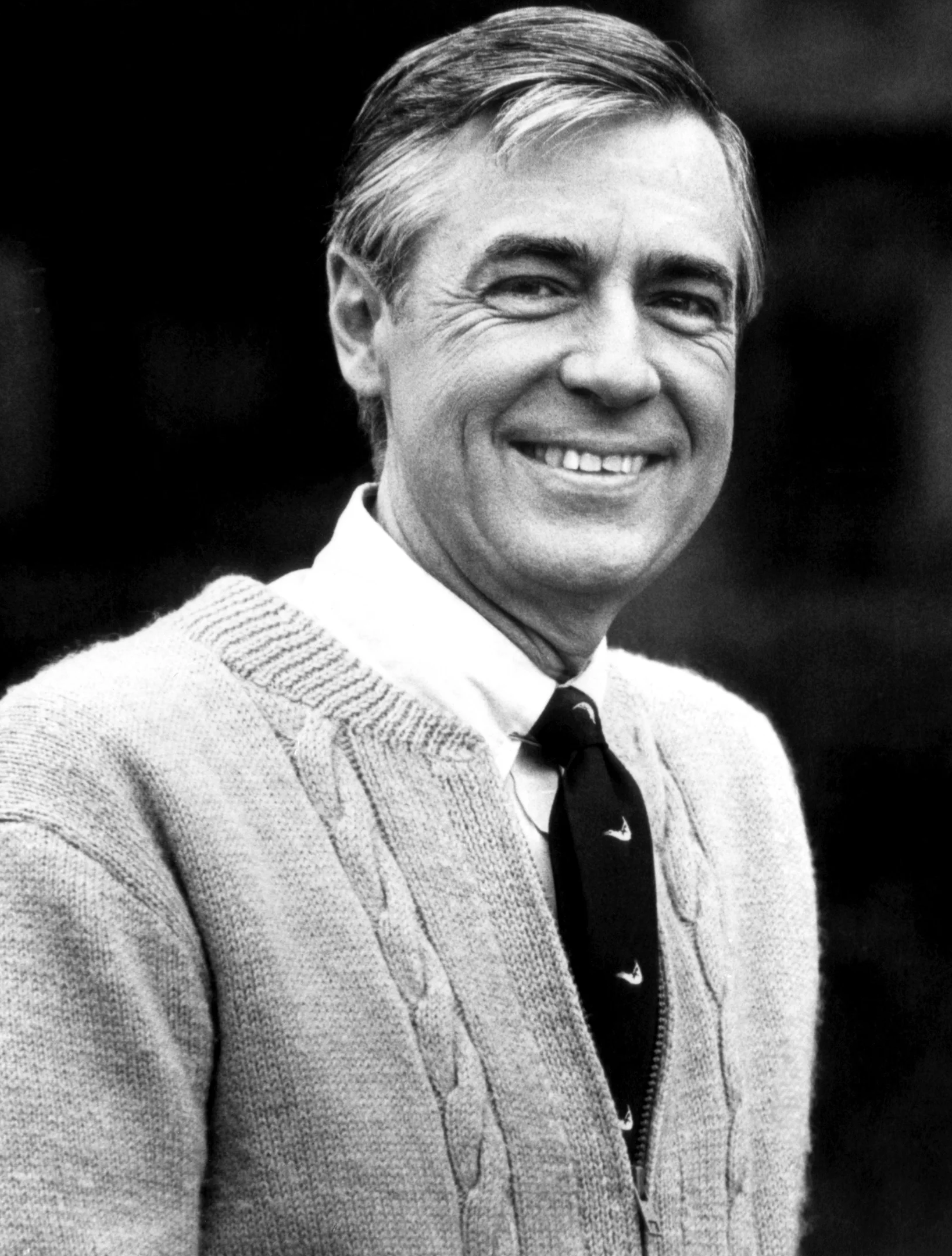
While most of the characters named in the song are fictional, several real people are also described as combatants. Top: Shaquille O'Neal, Aaron Carter, Abraham Lincoln. Middle: Jackie Chan, Chuck Norris, Benito Mussolini. Bottom: Dwayne Johnson, Hulk Hogan, Fred Rogers.

As Godzilla moves through Tokyo, Batman surprise attacks him with a Bat-Grenade. Godzilla's attempt to retaliate is blocked by Shaquille O'Neal's "Shaq Fu", followed by Aaron Carter attacking O'Neal, and Batman running over them both with the Batmobile. Abraham Lincoln then rises from the dead and shoots Batman with an AK-47. After Lincoln expends his ammunition, he flees on the arrival of Optimus Prime.

After Godzilla eats a piece of Optimus Prime, O'Neal returns but is then attacked by Jackie Chan. Meanwhile, Lincoln attempts to finish off Batman with a machete, but is stopped by Indiana Jones. Jones is left defenseless against Godzilla as Batman steals his gun, but Batman's shot misses and Chan deflects it. Lincoln, attempting to pole-vault onto Optimus Prime, collides with a somersaulting Chan in midair before they are both struck down by a Care Bear stare.

Chuck Norris, presented as a godlike figure, descends from the sky to angelic tones, kicks Indiana Jones in the groin, and crushes Batman's head with his thighs. Norris is then bested by a large army of additional characters, consisting of Gandalf the Grey, Gandalf the White, the Black Knight from Monty Python and the Holy Grail, Benito Mussolini, Chief Blue Meanie, Cowboy Curtis, Jambi the Genie, RoboCop, The Terminator, James T. Kirk, Darth Vader, Lo Pan, Superman, the Power Rangers, Bill S. Preston, Ted Logan, Spock, Dwayne 'The Rock' Johnson, Doctor Octopus, and Hulk Hogan.

Approximately a century later, the battle has officially ended and is implied to have claimed the lives of many more characters besides those mentioned, with only Fred Rogers left standing.

== Music video ==
The music video closely follows the plot of the song, with some notable differences. While the third verse describes a character army that "[kicks] Chuck Norris in his cowboy ass," it does not explicitly state whether this means Norris is killed or merely defeated. In the video however, Norris is killed, reduced to nothing but a cowboy hat. During the final chorus, after Fred Rogers alone survives, he raises a sword in victory, sheds a single tear, and commits Seppuku as he dances while bleeding out. The music video also features a host of characters not named in the song, including Robin (not a participant), Samuel L. Jackson and some snakes, Mario, Sonic the Hedgehog, Santa Claus, Goku, R2-D2, C-3PO, a Jawa, Tobias Fünke, Han Solo, Freddy Krueger, Jason Voorhees, Pac-Man, Eric Bauman, and Richard "Lowtax" Kyanka. The latter two characters are animated in the same designs as they were in the music video for Lemon Demon's song "Ebaum's World Dot Com". The version of Cowboy Curtis from Pee Wee's Playhouse that appears is a combination of that character's appearance as well as that of Morpheus from the Matrix franchise, in reference to both characters being played by Laurence Fishburne. The DeLorean time machine from the Back to the Future franchise appears as well.

== Personnel ==
- Neil Cicierega – vocals, instruments, programming, engineer, production
- Angel Marcloid – remastering (Needlejuice pressings)

Live (Only Not) version

- Neil Cicierega – vocals, piano
- Alora Lanzillotta – bass
- Charles "Chooch" Sergio – guitar
- Dave Kitsberg – guitar
- Greg Lanzillotta – drums, recording, mixing
