= Pinc Louds =

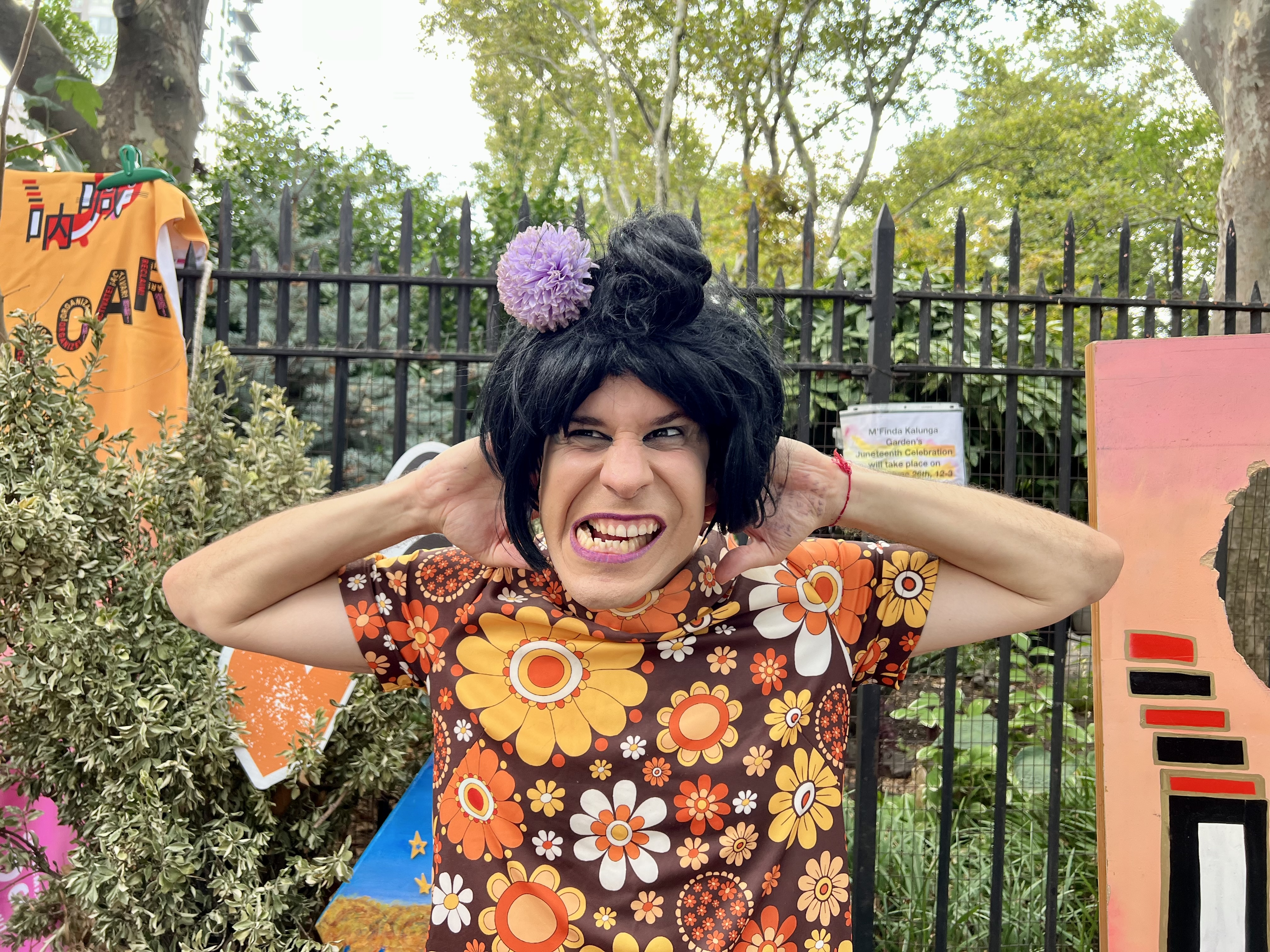
- Claudi, lead singer of Pinc Louds

Background information
- Origin: New York City
- Genres: punk rock, art-rock, indie, tropi-trash
- Years active: 2015–present
- Labels: Needlejuice Records
- Website: www.pinclouds.com

Pinc Louds is a music group based in New York City. The lead singer Claudi (pronounced "cloudy") is the main songwriter and public face of the band. Claudi, who uses any pronouns, describes the music as loud, punk, soft, and pink.

Pinc Louds has been known throughout New York City for performing in many nightclubs, but also for shows in public places such as subway stations and parks.

Claudi is from Puerto Rico and performed there before moving to New York.

The band became more popular during the COVID pandemic as they performed outdoors in public places.
