= Spirit Phone =

2016 album by Lemon Demon

Studio album by Lemon Demon
- Released: February 29, 2016
- Recorded: 2009–2016
- Genres: Indietronica; pop; synth-pop; synthpunk; geek rock
- Length: 59:24
- Labels: Self-released; Needlejuice

Lemon Demon chronology
Nature Tapes (2014)	Spirit Phone (2016)

Neil Cicierega chronology
Mouth Silence (2014)	Spirit Phone (2016)	Mouth Moods (2017)

Spirit Phone is the seventh studio album by Lemon Demon, a musical project created by American musician Neil Cicierega. The album was released digitally through Bandcamp on February 29, 2016, marking his first full-length album in eight years. All tracks were written, performed, and recorded by Neil Cicierega.

The album's cover art was created by Cicierega's wife, comic book artist Ming Doyle. The song "Sweet Bod" features a guitar solo by Dave Kitsberg of Time Lord rock group Time Crash. The album received generally positive reception and was largely successful, with the track "Touch-Tone Telephone" once being Lemon Demon's most streamed track with over 100 million streams on Spotify. On July 10, 2018, independent label Needlejuice Records announced vinyl, CD, and cassette releases of Spirit Phone.

== History ==
Shortly after the release of Lemon Demon's 2008 album View-Monster, Cicierega began work on the next Lemon Demon album which would be released eight years later as Spirit Phone. In July 2009, "Eighth Wonder", a song about the cryptid Gef, was made available as an MP3 download on Lemon Demon's website, followed by Cicierega releasing a music video for the song in November. A demo produced during this time titled "Ivanushka" would later be adapted into Spirit Phone track "Touch-Tone Telephone".

In April 2012, a live backing video for an early version of "Reaganomics" was uploaded to Cicierega's second channel, edited from clips of Ronald Reagan in his final film role The Killers. The song would be performed live at the anime convention Youmacon 2012, along with early versions of "As Your Father I Expressly Forbid It", "Ancient Aliens", and "Cabinet Man". In July 2012, Cicierega created two unused opening themes for the animated television series Gravity Falls, elements of which would become Spirit Phone bonus tracks "Gravitron" and "Moon's Request", the latter being a remix of its respective theme.

In October 2014, "When He Died" was released on Patreon. The album was released digitally on February 29, 2016, followed by a remastered physical release on vinyl, CD, and cassette in October 2018 by Needlejuice Records, followed by 8-track and minidisc releases in 2019 and 2020.

== Reception ==
Mashable included "Touch-Tone Telephone" and "Eighth Wonder" on their official 2019 Halloween playlist, calling "Touch-Tone Telephone" one of many "real gems". Cultured Vultures called the horror-themed Spirit Phone "one of the wildest pop albums of the year". The album was the best-selling album on Bandcamp for the first week of its release.

"Cabinet Man", a song about a man who turns himself into a half-human arcade machine, would later inspire the indie game Neon Nemesis, featured at the 2019 Alt.Ctrl.GDC Exhibition. The game is played by up to four racers, against a fifth player, the "nemesis" who controls their character out of sight of the others, from inside the game cabinet itself. American animator Aimkid released fanmade music videos for "Cabinet Man", "Lifetime Achievement Award", and "Soft Fuzzy Man", releasing the latter in September 2020 and boosting the song in popularity.

== Track listing ==
All tracks are written by Neil Cicierega.

No.	Title	Length
1.	"Lifetime Achievement Award"	6:07
2.	"Touch-Tone Telephone"	4:43
3.	"Cabinet Man"	4:23
4.	"No Eyed Girl"	4:20
5.	"When He Died"	4:34
6.	"Sweet Bod"	4:11
7.	"Eighth Wonder"	4:42
8.	"Ancient Aliens"	4:16
9.	"Soft Fuzzy Man"	2:54
10.	"As Your Father I Expressly Forbid It"	2:53
11.	"I Earn My Life"	3:11
12.	"Reaganomics"	3:32
13.	"Man-Made Object"	3:38
14.	"Spiral of Ants"	6:01
Total length:		59:24

=== Bonus tracks ===
The album also contains 13 bonus tracks; consisting of demos, cut songs, and additional music. The following is the track listing of the deluxe bonus CD. On digital services these tracks are arranged in alphabetical order and all subtitled "(Bonus Track)"; and "Sweet Bod (Demo)" is simply named "Sweet Bod".

No.	Title	Length
1.	"Crisis Actors"	4:48
2.	"Redesign Your Logo"	4:21
3.	"Pizza Heroes"	1:31
4.	"You're at the Party"	5:21
5.	"Angry People"	4:54
6.	"Geocities"	3:25
7.	"Angelfire"	3:41
8.	"Gravitron"	0:53
9.	"Moon's Request"	2:21
10.	"Sweet Bod (Demo)"	4:14
11.	"Cat Hacks"	3:07
12.	"Cabinet Man (Demo)"	2:41
13.	"Kubrick and the Beast"	2:44
Total length:		1:43:25

The vinyl and cassette releases contain the bonus tracks "Crisis Actors", "Redesign Your Logo", "Pizza Heroes", "You're at the Party" and "Angry People". The bonus track "Kubrick and the Beast" was added to the vinyl and cassette releases starting with 2022 pressings. All physical releases also include a download card for the full album, along with album commentary by Cicierega, except for the CD release which already has the full album and commentary.

== Personnel ==
- Neil Cicierega – vocals, instruments, programming, engineering, production
- Dave Kitsberg – electric guitar (6)
- Ming Doyle – cover artwork, picture disc artwork
- Mark Kramer – remastering (Needlejuice pressings 2018–2021)
- Angel Marcloid – remastering (Needlejuice pressings beginning in 2022)
