= Archéophone =

Electric version of gramophone

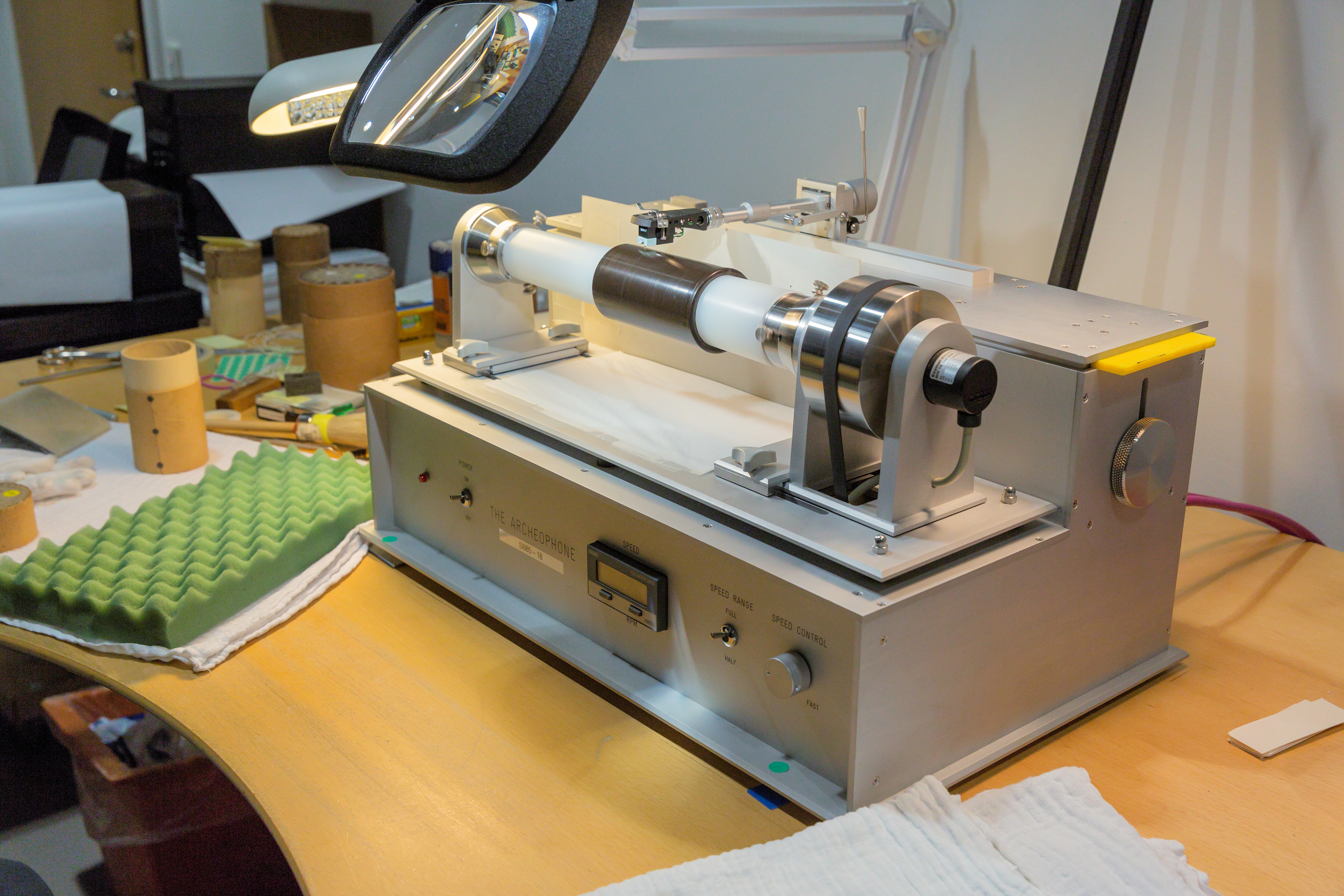
Archéophone in Statsbiblioteket in Aarhus, Denmark

The Archéophone is a modern, electric version of the phonographs and ediphones from the 19th and early 20th century. It is specifically designed to transfer phonograph cylinders and other cylinder formats to modern recording media.

Designed in France by Henri Chamoux, the machine is used to transfer and preserve recordings at The Library of Congress, the Bibliothèque Nationale de France, Edison National Historic Site, UC Santa Barbara, University of North Carolina, University College Dublin, the Canadian Museum of Civilization and many other libraries and archives. Weighing almost 25 kg and costing over US $30,000, the Archéophone is a specialist's tool and not available to the general public. However, CDs with transferred cylinder recordings have been made available by various record labels and organizations.

== See also ==
- The Archeophone pages
- Latest news from the Phonobase
- Cylinder Preservation and Digitization Project
