= Cylinder Audio Archive =

Digitisation of phonograph cylinders

The Cylinder Audio Archive is a free digital collection maintained by the University of California, Santa Barbara Library with streaming and downloadable versions of over 10,000 phonograph cylinders manufactured between 1893 and the mid-1920s. The Archive began in November 2003 as the successor of the earlier Cylinder Preservation and Digitization Pilot Project.

== History ==
The pilot project began in 2002 to test the feasibility of digitizing cylinder recordings on a large scale for preservation and public access and explore issues related to the preservation and digitization of cylinder records. In 2003, the Institute for Museum and Library Services funded the Archive with a grant for $205,000 and between 2003 and 2005 UCSB library staff cataloged and digitized over 6,000 of the cylinder recordings in the library's collection using an archéophone, a modern electrical cylinder player designed in France by Henri Chamoux. The website was released to the public on November 16, 2005. Since outside project funding has ended a further 4,000 cylinders have been added to the archive.

== Scope ==
The Archive consists of a broad range of cylinder records manufactured between 1893 and the mid-1920s. The majority were produced by Edison Records in Orange, New Jersey, but the Archive also contains cylinders produced by the Columbia Phonograph Co., Indestructible Records and other companies. The majority of the cylinders feature music and include band recordings, popular songs, vaudeville, opera arias, and music for solo instruments such as banjo, violin and accordion, but the Archive also contains speeches, comedic monologues and home recordings.

The Archive currently holds only the cylinders in the collection of the UCSB Libraries. Other libraries, including the Library of Congress and Bowling Green State University, have contributed cylinders for preservation and digitization, as have private collectors. The Archive accepts donations of cylinders but at present does not add digital files of cylinders from other collections, the one exception being cylinders in the collection of John Levin.

== See also ==
- The Great 78 Project
