= Lemon Demon =

American geek rock band

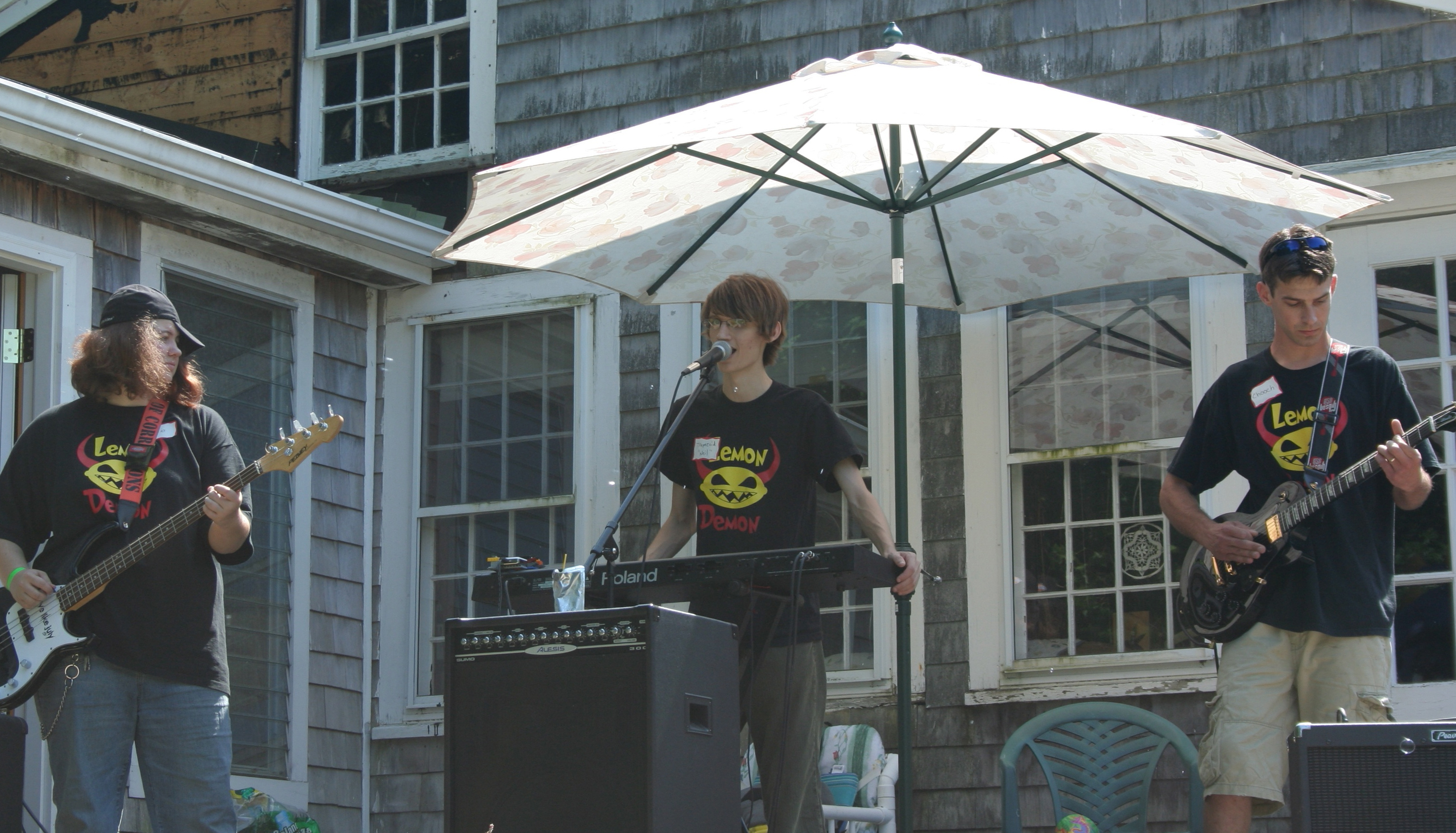
- Lemon Demon performing in 2006

Background information
- Also known as: Trapezoid; Deporitaz
- Origin: Boston, Massachusetts, U.S.
- Genres: Pop rock; alternative rock; synth-pop; synth punk; new wave; geek rock
- Years active: 2003–present
- Labels: MP3.com; CDFreedom; Needlejuice
- Members: Neil Cicierega; (see live members)
- Website: lemondemon.com

Lemon Demon is a musical project and band created by American comedian and musician Neil Cicierega in 2003 in Boston, Massachusetts. Lemon Demon's studio work is performed solely by Cicierega, who is the project's sole official member. Live performances also include a backing band, with previous performances consisting of Alora Lanzillotta, Charles Sergio, Anthony Wry, Dave Kitsberg, and Greg Lanzillotta.

The band gained a cult following on the Internet in the 2000s, thanks in large part to the viral success of the Flash animated music video for their song "The Ultimate Showdown of Ultimate Destiny" (2005). As of 2026, Lemon Demon has released seven studio albums and five EPs.

== History ==
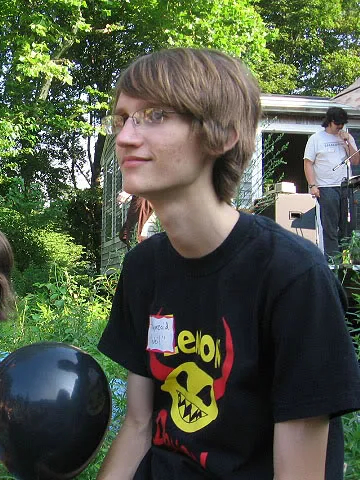
Cicierega wearing a Trapezoid name tag over a Lemon Demon shirt in 2006

Neil Cicierega began releasing instrumental music and several remixes of video game music under the moniker Trapezoid in the late 1990s and early 2000s, creating 4 albums: Outsmart (2000), Microwave This CD (2001), Dimes (2002) and Circa 2000 (2007) while he was frequently active on Adventure Game Studio. The artist name was retroactively anagrammed to "Deporitaz" as an existing band called Trapezoid demanded that he change it, despite Neil having moved on from releasing music under Trapezoid. On January 21, 2003, Cicierega released Lemon Demon's first song on mp3.com, "Don't Be Like the Sun", later saying "eventually I started experimenting with singing, and once I felt ready to do that full time, I christened myself Lemon Demon and went into it head on". He then released his first four albums: Clown Circus (2003), Live from the Haunted Candle Shop (2003), Hip to the Javabean (2004), and Damn Skippy (2005).

In late 2005, Cicierega and animator Shawn Vulliez released a Flash animated music video for Lemon Demon's "The Ultimate Showdown of Ultimate Destiny". The video amassed over 6.5 million views in 6 months on Newgrounds and topped the "Funny Five" on The Dr. Demento Show for several weeks, becoming the No. 1 Request for 2006. The song was later included in Lemon Demon's fifth album Dinosaurchestra (2006). An updated recording of it was released to the Rock Band Network in 2010. Lemon Demon's sixth studio album, View-Monster (2008), features "Modify" as a bonus track, which later became a popular song on TikTok. A remix of the Beatles' "While My Guitar Gently Weeps" (titled "While My Keytar Gently Weeps") is additionally included as a bonus track on the album. Another notable track from View-Monster is "Bill Watterson", about a fan obsessing over comic artist Bill Watterson.

Cicierega released Spirit Phone as Lemon Demon's seventh studio album on February 29, 2016. The album was the No. 1 best-selling album on Bandcamp for the first week of its release. On July 10, 2018, it was announced that copies of the album on CD, cassette, and vinyl would be sold through Needlejuice Records, who would later physically distribute remastered versions of all of Lemon Demon's studio work dating back to 2005. "Touch-Tone Telephone" later became Lemon Demon's most-streamed song, surpassing "The Ultimate Showdown of Ultimate Destiny" in September 2020. This was then surpassed by "Fine" in July 2024, which had garnered over 75 million streams on Spotify at the time. As of March 2026, "Fine" is still Lemon Demon's most streamed song with 129 million streams.

Cicierega uploaded the song "Funkytown" to his Patreon page in 2017, later contributing it to the 2020 charity compilation album Needlejustice, which benefits the NAACP Legal Defense Fund. It would later be released as an official single alongside "One Weird Tip" on January 21, 2023.

== Viral successes ==
=== "The Ultimate Showdown of Ultimate Destiny" ===
On December 22, 2005, Lemon Demon and animator Shawn Vulliez released the Flash music video "The Ultimate Showdown of Ultimate Destiny" on Newgrounds. The video features cartoon versions of dozens of real-life celebrities and fictional characters, largely from 1980s and 1990s pop culture, in a large century-long brawl. It gained a cult following among web enthusiasts and became the "user's choice" on December 28, 2005, accumulating 6.5 million views within 6 months. It appeared on several other websites including Albino Blacksheep.

Lemon Demon was also a frequent guest at the anime convention Youmacon and have also performed live at the convention itself.

=== "Brodyquest" ===
On June 1, 2010, Cicierega released a video and single titled "Brodyquest" on his main YouTube channel, picturing famous actor Adrien Brody going about his daily life in a comedic manner. The video became a viral meme, later receiving placement on the EP Nature Tapes (2014). It would be brought up by Stephen Colbert during his interview with Adrien Brody in a 2016 episode of The Late Show with Stephen Colbert. The video was also featured on Polygon's list of the greatest achievements in dumb internet video.

== Members ==
Official members

- Neil Cicierega – vocals, keyboards, guitar, programming, percussion, songwriting, production (2003–present)

Live members

- Alora Lanzillotta – bass guitar, vocals (2004–2012)
- Charles "Chooch" Sergio – guitar (2006–2012)
- Anthony Wry – drums (2007–2008), guitar, vocals (2012)
- Dave Kitsberg – guitar, vocals (2008–2012, 2016)
- Greg Lanzillotta – drums (2009–2012)

Timeline

== Discography ==
=== Studio albums ===
Title	Details
Clown Circus	Release date: 5 April 2003; Label: MP3.com, self-released; Format: CD, DL
Live from the Haunted Candle Shop (Note: Despite its title, it is not actually a live album.)	Release date: 23 July 2003; Label: MP3.com, self-released; Format: CD, DL
Hip to the Javabean	Release date: 23 March 2004; Label: Self-released, Needlejuice Records; Format: CD, DL, cassette, MD, streaming, 12"
Damn Skippy	Release date: 21 March 2005; Label: Self-released, Needlejuice Records; Format: CD, DL, cassette, MD, streaming, 12"
Dinosaurchestra	Release date: 20 July 2006; Label: Self-released, Needlejuice Records; Format: CD, DL, cassette, MD, streaming, 12"
View-Monster	Release date: 1 August 2008; Label: Self-released, Needlejuice Records; Format: CD, DL, cassette, MD, streaming, 12", 8-track
Spirit Phone	Release date: 29 February 2016; Label: Self-released, Needlejuice Records; Format: CD, DL, cassette, MD, streaming, 12", 8-track

=== Compilation albums ===
Title	Details
Almanac 2009	Release date: 31 October 2009; Label: Self-released; Format: CD

=== Extended plays ===
Title	Details
Live (Only Not) (Note: An EP of studio-recorded versions of previous Lemon Demon songs with the live band.)	Release date: 28 April 2011; Label: Self-released; Format: DL, streaming
I Am Become Christmas	Release date: 21 December 2012; Label: Self-released, Needlejuice Records; Format: CD, DL, cassette, MD, streaming, 10", 12"
Nature Tapes	Release date: 24 March 2014; Label: Self-released, Needlejuice Records; Format: CD, DL, cassette, MD, Floppy Disc streaming, 10", 12"
Something Glowing (Note: Compilation of songs previously released on View-Monster (2008) on 7-inch vinyl, mainly bonus tracks)	Release date: 17 December 2020; Label: Needlejuice Records; Format: DL, 7"
Acrobat Unstable Record (Note: Compilation of bonus tracks previously released on Dinosaurchestra (2006) on 7-inch vinyl)	Release date: 1 September 2022; Label: Needlejuice Records; Format: DL, 7"

=== Singles ===
Title	Year	Album
"Lemon Demon"	2003	Clown Circus
"The Ultimate Showdown of Ultimate Destiny"	2005	Dinosaurchestra
"Stick Stickly"	2005	Non-album singles (Note: Later included on Dinosaurchestra as bonus tracks.)
"Every Time You Stifle a Sneeze"	2006	Non-album singles
"Being Alone on Valentine's Day"	2006	Non-album singles
"White Bread Boyfriend"	2006	Non-album singles
"Snakes on a Plane"	2006	Non-album singles
"Amnesia Was Her Name"	2007	View-Monster
"Knife Fight"	2007	View-Monster
"Everyday French"	2007	Non-album singles (Note: Later included on View-Monster as bonus tracks.)
"Super Hey Ya"	2007	Non-album singles
"123456 Pokemon"	2008	Non-album singles
"While My Keytar Gently Weeps"	2008	Non-album singles
"Ben Bernanke"	2008	Non-album singles
"Toy Food"	2009	Non-album singles
"Eighth Wonder"	2009	Almanac 2009 (Note: A different version of the song was later released on Spirit Phone.)
"Brodyquest"	2010	Nature Tapes
"Goosebumps"	2011	Nature Tapes
"Really Cool Wig"	2011	Nature Tapes
"Money Dollar Bills"	2012	Non-album single
"A Mask of My Own Face"	2012	Nature Tapes
"My Trains"	2013	Nature Tapes
"Jaws"	2013	Nature Tapes
"Everybody Loves Raymond"	2013	Nature Tapes
"Two Trucks"	2013	Nature Tapes
"When He Died"	2014	Spirit Phone (Note: "Kubrick and the Beast" was included on Spirit Phone as a bonus track on release.)
"Kubrick and the Beast"	2015	Spirit Phone
"One Weird Tip"/"Funkytown"	2023	Non-album single
"Touch-Tone Telephone" (Note: Wax cylinder single.)	2023	Spirit Phone
"The Oldest Man on MySpace"	2023	Non-album single (Note: Wax cylinder single, song included on Dinosaurchestra as a bonus track.)
