= Telediphone =

Sound recording system

The telediphone was an early sound recording system, using cylindrical recording media.

One such system was used from 20 December 1938 at the US Navy radio intercept station at Shanghai, to monitor the Moscow-Tokyo diplomatic circuit, using two recorders. In January 1939, this equipment was reported as more successful than automatic recording equipment trialed for the same purpose.

The Telediphone Unit was a transcribing department of the BBC using cylinder and other machines, which produced a typed transcript of (primarily) interview recordings. A recording could be ordered by a producer to be fed to the Unit and after a few days would receive a typed copy.
