= Neil Cicierega =

American musician, comedian and filmmaker (born 1986)

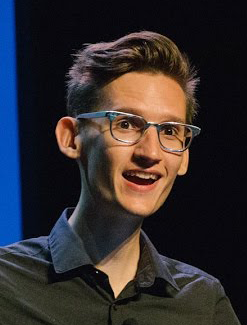
- Cicierega in September 2016
- Born: August 23, 1986 (age 40); Bridgewater, Massachusetts, U.S.
- Other names: Lemon Demon; Deporitaz; Trapezoid; Trapezzoid; MEGO vs. SPAGO; Grapes and Sunshine; MC Webmasta
- Occupations: Comedian; actor; filmmaker; singer; musician; songwriter; puppeteer; artist; game developer; animator
- Years active: 1998–present
- Spouse: Ming Doyle (m. 2015)
- Children: 1
- Musical career
- Genres: Rock; pop; new wave; comedy; mashup
- Member of: Lemon Demon
- Formerly of: Deporitaz; Trapezoid
- Website: neilcic.com

Neil Stephen Cicierega (/ˌsɪsəˈriːɡə/ SISS-ə-REE-gə; born August 23, 1986) is an American musician, filmmaker, YouTuber, and animator. He is known as the creator of Potter Puppet Pals, "The Ultimate Showdown of Ultimate Destiny", and various music albums under the name Lemon Demon, along with a series of mashup albums under his own name.

== Early life ==
Neil Stephen Cicierega was born in Bridgewater, Massachusetts, on August 23, 1986, and raised in the nearby town of Kingston. He is one of four children born to Nancy and Jerry Cicierega. At a young age, Cicierega started using a simple game developing program named Klik & Play. Beginning in the fourth grade, his parents homeschooled him and his siblings. He continued making amateur games, and began creating digital music to feature in them; he soon shared his music online through MP3.com under the name Trapezoid, which was later renamed to the anagram "Deporitaz" at the behest of another band already named Trapezoid. He also began composing MIDI music fragments that were referenced in his later works.

== Career ==
=== Animutation ===
Cicierega was first known for a series of dadaist or surrealist Flash animations he termed "Animutation". Animutations feature arbitrary, nonsensical scenes and pop culture imagery and are typically set to novelty or foreign music, often from the Japanese version of Pokémon.

=== Potter Puppet Pals ===
Cicierega's Potter Puppet Pals is a comedy series which parodies the Harry Potter books and films. It originated as a pair of Flash animations on Newgrounds in 2003, and later resurfaced in the form of a series of live-action puppet shows released onto YouTube and PotterPuppetPals.com, starting in 2006. The central characters of the Harry Potter series are portrayed simply by puppets, all of which were fabricated by Cicierega's mother. The most successful Potter Puppet Pals video, The Mysterious Ticking Noise, has over 210 million views as of January 2026. Cicierega has done puppetry live at Harry Potter-themed events.

=== Lemon Demon ===
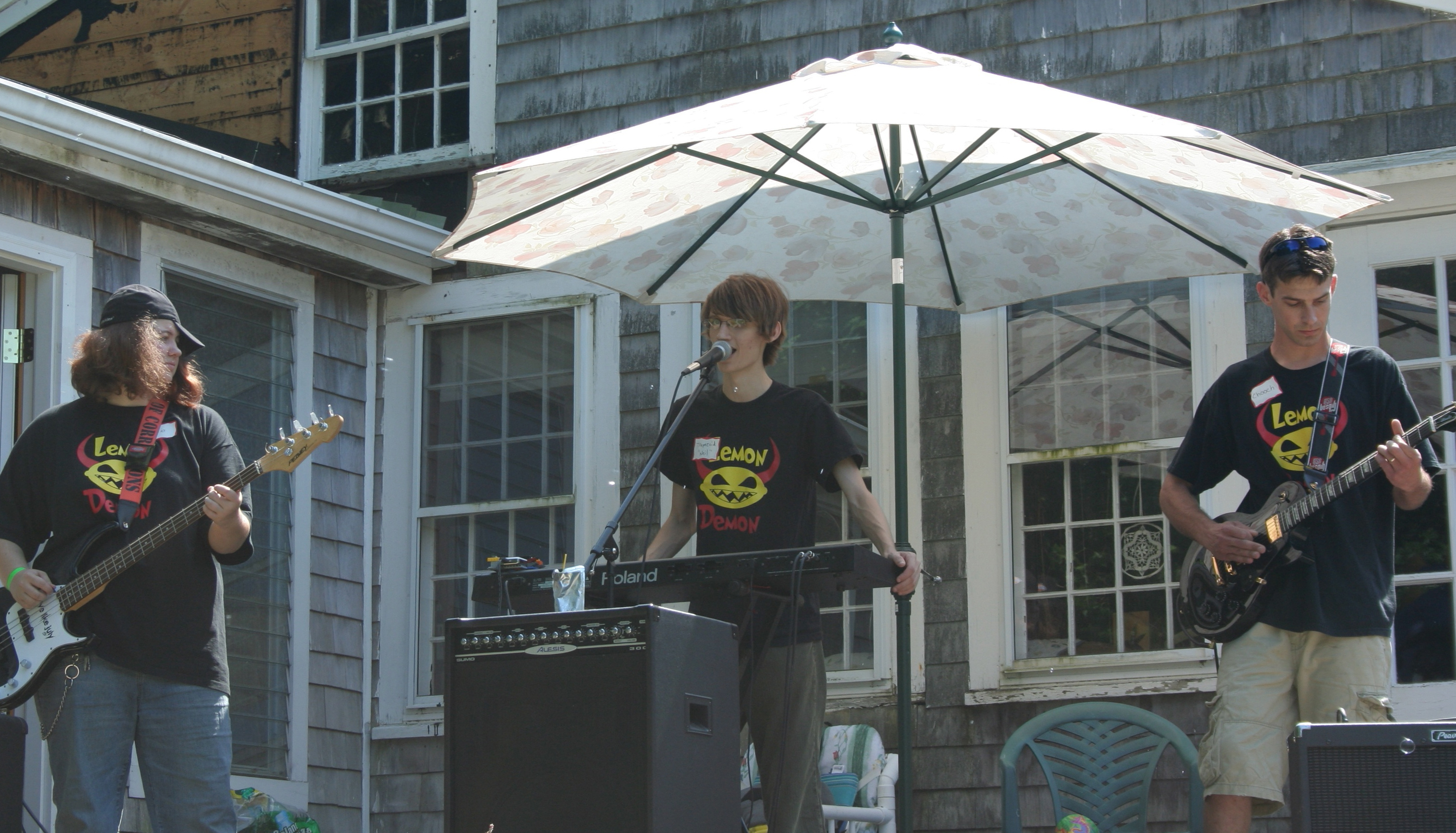
Lemon Demon performing in 2006

Since 2003, Cicierega has released 7 full-length albums and 4 extended plays under his musical project Lemon Demon. In 2005, he and animator Shawn Vulliez released a Flash animated music video "The Ultimate Showdown of Ultimate Destiny" on Newgrounds. The song was later included in the 2006 album Dinosaurchestra. An updated recording of the song was released to the Rock Band Network in 2010.

In April 2009, Cicierega released his first four albums as free downloads on his site "neilcic.com"; however, they are now currently hosted on "lemondemon.com".

In January 2016, Cicierega announced Spirit Phone, a full-length Lemon Demon album released on February 29, 2016. On July 10, 2018, it was announced that copies of the album on CD, cassette tape and vinyl would be sold through Needlejuice Records, who would later distribute remastered versions of Lemon Demon's Christmas EP I Am Become Christmas, as well as Nature Tapes, View-Monster, Dinosaurchestra, Damn Skippy, and Hip to the Javabean.

=== The Mouth mashup albums ===
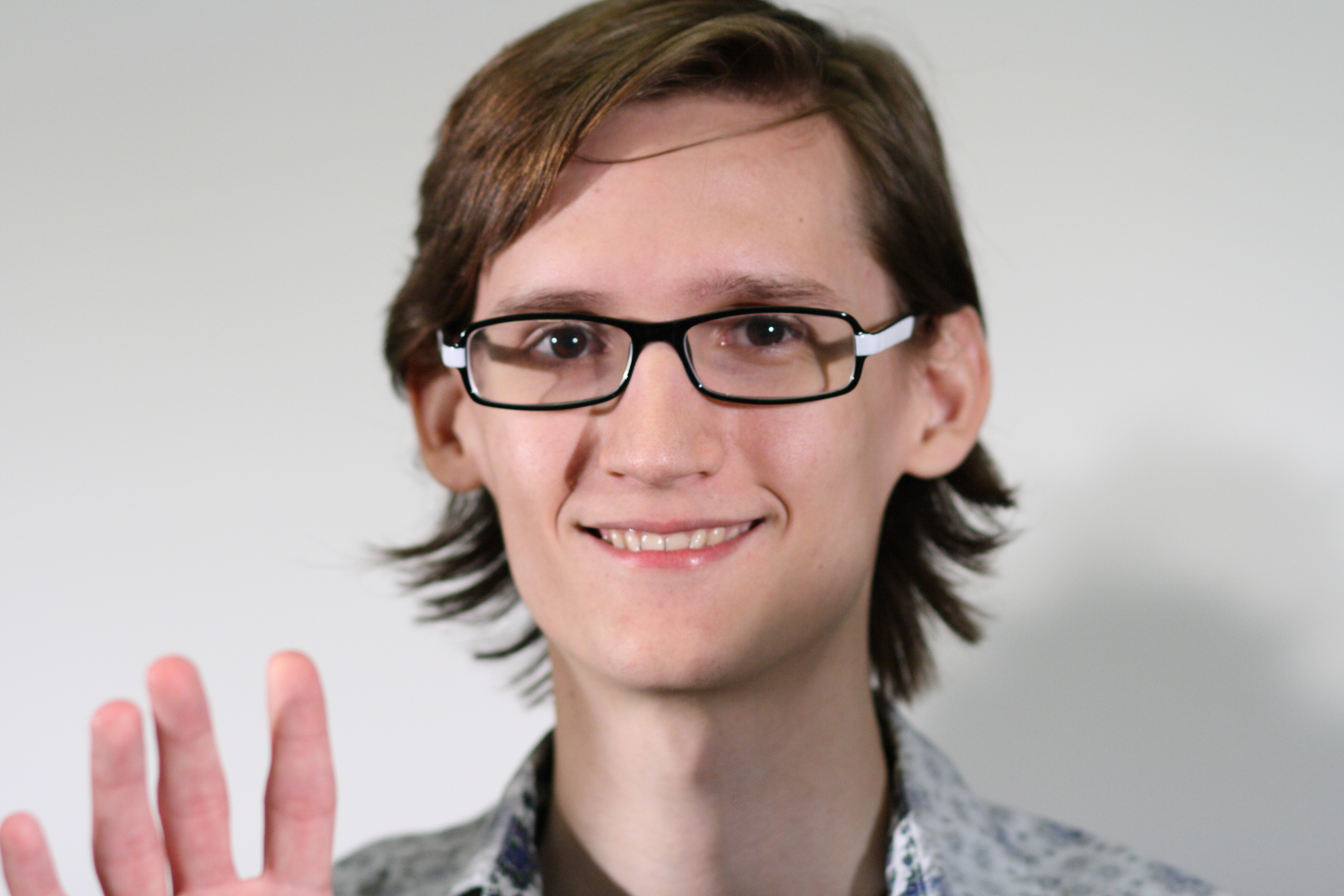
Cicierega in 2010

Cicierega has also created mashup music under his own name. He released two mashup albums, Mouth Sounds and Mouth Silence, as free downloads in 2014, and a third, Mouth Moods, in 2017. A fourth album, Mouth Dreams, was released on September 30, 2020. All four albums are linked by their usage of Smash Mouth's "All Star", which is repeated frequently throughout Sounds and Moods, and appears through Easter eggs and references in Silence. In Mouth Dreams, "All Star" only makes one appearance in the track "Mouth Dreams (Extro)", where a heavily distorted edit of the lyrics can be heard.

=== Guaranteed* Video ===
Neil Cicierega, as well as his friends Ryan Murphy and Kevin James, form the sketch comedy group Guaranteed* Video. Their YouTube channel features skits as well as live-streams.

=== Other works ===
In October 2012, Cicierega created the darkly satirical "Windows 95 Tips, Tricks, and Tweaks" blog, located at windows95tips.tumblr.com. In the blog's telling, Windows 95 is a brooding, evil presence bent on dominating humanity. Most of the posts are faked error messages, with messages like "Windows needs a lock of your hair to continue," but presented in the exact graphical style of Windows 95. The blog has received favorable press attention.

In February 2019, Cicierega created Endless Jeopardy, a Twitter account that automatically posts a bot-generated Jeopardy! prompt every hour and awards points to the most-liked responses within 15 minutes. Cicierega was commissioned to make a number of songs for the TV series Gravity Falls; however, only one was used, this being "Goat and a Pig", which was used in the end credits of the episode "The Love God".

== Personal life ==
On August 8, 2015, Cicierega married illustrator and comic artist Ming Doyle, with whom he lives in Somerville, Massachusetts. Their daughter was born in March 2018. Cicierega's sister, Emmy, is an animator who has worked on television series such as Gravity Falls, DuckTales, and The Owl House. Emmy also wrote and performed alongside Neil on Potter Puppet Pals.

== Discography ==
=== Deporitaz/Trapezoid ===
- Outsmart (2000)
- Microwave This CD (2001)
- OC ReMix: Monkey Island 2: LeChuck's Revenge "Monkey Brain Soup for the Soul" (2002)
- Dimes (2002)
- Circa 2000 (2007)
- The Count Censored (2007)

=== Lemon Demon ===
- Clown Circus (2003)
- Live from the Haunted Candle Shop (2003)
- Hip to the Javabean (2004)
- Damn Skippy (2005)
- Dinosaurchestra (2006)
- View-Monster (2008)
- Almanac 2009 (2009)
- Live (Only Not) (2011)
- I Am Become Christmas (2012)
- Nature Tapes (2014)
- Spirit Phone (2016)
- Something Glowing (2020)
- Acrobat Unstable Record (2022)

=== Neil Cicierega ===
- Mouth Sounds (2014)
- Mouth Silence (2014)
- Mouth Moods (2017)
- Not for Resale: A Video Game Store Documentary OST (2020)
- Mouth Dreams (2020)

=== Potter Puppet Pals ===
- Potter Puppet Pals EP (2014)
