= Needlejuice Records =

Independent record label

- Founded: 2017; 9 years ago
- Founder: Brandon Brown; Jace McLain; Austin Aeschliman
- Country of origin: United States
- Location: Nashville, Tennessee
- Official website: needlejuicerecords.com

Needlejuice Records is an independent record label founded in September 2017 and operated by Austin Aeschliman, Jace McLain, and Brandon Brown. The label's first release, issued in 2017, was the album Polygondwanaland by King Gizzard & the Lizard Wizard.

== Label roster ==
=== Current artists ===
- Angel Marcloid
- Ashley Ninelives
- Bazooty
- Billy Cobb
- Blinker the Star
- Bolonium
- The Boobles
- Bryan Scary
- bubbo
- Cat System Corp.
- Chill Caterpillar
- Chinese Hackers
- Coaltar of the Deepers
- Dave Soldier
- Deer God & Luminous Shade
- Desert Sand Feels Warm at Night
- Dogbowl
- Eldren
- Flummox
- Haishen
- Icosahedron
- I've Made Too Much Pasta
- Joe Siris
- Kawai Sprite
- King Gizzard & the Lizard Wizard
- King Missile
- Leema Mountain (also known as Lima Research Society)
- Left at London
- Lemon Demon
- LEX the Lexicon Artist
- Logan Whitehurst & the Jr. Science Club
- Louie Zong
- Luminous Shade
- Marc with a C
- MC Lars
- Mega Ran
- Meth Wax
- Multibird
- Napoleon XIV
- Nick Lutsko
- Nuclear Bubble Wrap
- The Odd Ditties
- OK Glass
- Ookla the Mok
- Pinc Louds
- Plasma Canvas
- Raptor Vomit
- Regdar and the Fighters
- The Scary Jokes
- Schäffer The Darklord
- Skeleton Lipstick
- Steve Goodie
- Steve Jay
- Summer Woods
- SYCDVK
- Tally Hall
- TheRealSullyG
- Tom Lehrer
- Trouble's Afoot
- Trust Fund Ozu
- Worm Quartet
- Zer0 れい

=== Former artists ===
- The Orion Experience
- TV's Kyle
