= List of albums containing a hidden track =

The following article contains a list albums that contain a hidden track. All albums in the list are either notable albums or were recorded by a notable artist. The list is ordered by artist name, using the surname where appropriate. Hidden tracks can be found in the pregap or as a track following the listed tracks. To avoid duplication, pregap hidden tracks are not listed below, but can be found in list of albums with tracks hidden in the pregap. Note that all printings of an album do not contain the same track arrangements, so some editions of a particular album may not have the hidden track(s) listed below or may actually list the previously hidden track.

== 0-9 ==
- 311, Stereolithic: Hidden track 16 after "Tranquility".
- The 1975, Sex: "Milk" was a hidden track within the track "You"
- 1000 Mona Lisas, New Disease: hidden track is a cover of Alanis Morissette's "You Oughta Know"

== A ==
- ABBA, Super Trouper: On the original vinyl version, the audience applause at the end of the last track continued into the inner groove, playing infinitely until the needle is removed.
- Aerosmith:
  - Live! Bootleg: "Draw the Line" at the end of the "Mother Popcorn" track.
  - Pump: Untitled, instrumental track following "What It Takes".
- AFI: The Art of Drowning: The hidden track "Battled" plays seven minutes after the last listed track, "Morningstar".
- Afghan Whigs, Congregation: Unlisted track 12, "Miles Iz Ded".
- Damon Albarn, The Nearer the Fountain, More Pure the Stream Flows: the CD version includes a twenty-minute long hidden tracks "Huldufólk"
- Alice in Chains, Dirt: "Iron Gland" is unlisted between "God Smack" and "Hate To Feel". It is also called "Dream Sequence".
- All Star United, International Anthems for the Human Race: "Hurricane" and a sped-up demo version of "International Anthem" follow the last track, "Put Your Arms Around Me".
- Gary Allan, It Would Be You: Features an unlisted song called "No Judgment Day" as a hidden track.
- alt-J, This Is All Yours: the hidden track is a cover of Bill Withers' "Lovely Day" following "Leaving Nara".
- Ambulance LTD, LP: a cover of the Velvet Underground's "Ocean" is the hidden track
- Amesoeurs, Amesoeurs: An untitled hidden track begins after a few minutes of silence at the end of the album.
- American Music Club, San Francisco, track 15 is an instrumental version of "Fearless" and track 16 is a cover of "California Dreamin"
- Ian Anderson, The Secret Language of Birds: "In the Grip of Stronger Stuff" and "Thick as a Brick" at the end of the album, but this hidden track is not on all of the copies.
- Aphex Twin, Selected Ambient Works Volume II: Track 19 on the album was originally omitted from the CD pressings due to its length exceeding the hardware's capability, although it was later included on the vinyl pressing without being listed.
- Arcade Fire, Reflektor: includes an untitled hidden track after the final track on Disc 2.
- Artists United Against Apartheid, Sun City: includes a song by U2 called "Silver and Gold"
- Ash, 1977: includes the hidden track "Sick Party", the sounds of the band vomiting, ten minutes the final track.
- Asking Alexandria, Asking Alexandria: After a period of silence following the final track (a radio edit of "Into the Fire"), there is a hidden track "Xplicit".
- Atlas, Reasons for Voyaging: After the final track "Doctor", there is a period of silence, and at 5:23, there is a hidden song called "Firefly".
- Atmosphere, Seven's Travels: "Say Shhh..." plays at the end of the album.
- Autechre, LP5: An untitled track follows either a long period of silence on track 11, or appears as track 12
- AZ, A.W.O.L.: At the end of the album's last track, there are three hidden tracks, "Live Wire", "Magic Hour", and "The Truth".

== B ==
- Backstreet Boys, A Night Out with the Backstreet Boys: includes the hidden tracks "The One", "Show Me the Meaning of Being Lonely", and "I Need You Tonight"
- Barenaked Ladies:
  - Gordon: After "Crazy", several studio outtakes, giggles, and ad-libs occur. This track is sometimes referred to as "Dat Fodder".
  - Maroon: includes the hidden track "Hidden Sun" at the end, which is notable for being the first Barenaked Ladies song written and sung by Kevin Hearn.
- Beach House:
  - Beach House: After a one-minute silence succeeding its final track "Heart and Lungs", which ends at 4:25, its hidden track, "Rain in Numbers", plays at 5:25.
  - Bloom: After its final track "Irene" ends at 6:44, it goes into a six-minute silence before its hidden track, "Wherever You Go", plays at 13:16 of the track.
- Beastie Boys: Root Down: After a 32-second silence after track 10 is a 30-second bonus that features men talking about the Beastie Boys in German and Japanese while "So What'cha Want" plays in the background.
- The Beatles:
  - Sgt. Pepper's Lonely Hearts Club Band: Several seconds after the final track "A Day in the Life", a loop of random edits and samples plays backwards. On the original vinyl, this looped endlessly (and could arguably be the first hidden track) as it was placed in the inner groove; however, on CD it only loops about eight or nine times before fading out.
  - The Beatles (The White Album): "Can You Take Me Back", a short Paul McCartney song, appears in between "Cry Baby Cry" and "Revolution 9".
  - Abbey Road: The 23-second track "Her Majesty" follows fourteen seconds of silence at the end of the album.
- The Beavis and Butt-Head Experience: following a period of silence after the album's final track is a reprise of the third track, "Come to Butt-Head" by Beavis and Butt-Head (Mike Judge); it repeats the original track's first verse, then continues with new lyrics where the two are joined by rapper Positive K
- Beck:
  - Mellow Gold: "Analog Odyssey" appears a few minutes after "Blackhole".
  - Odelay: There is a loop of electronic noise called "Computer Rock" a few minutes after "Ramshackle".
  - Mutations: includes the hidden track "Diamond Bollocks"
- Adrian Belew, Here: track thirteen is an unlisted instrumental
- Belle and Sebastian, 3.. 6.. 9 Seconds of Light/Push Barman to Open Old Wounds: there is an unnamed hidden track "3...6...9"
- Ben Folds Five, Whatever and Ever Amen: The hidden track, a message by Ben Folds about Ben Folds, appears after the final track on the original album
- Better Than Ezra, Deluxe: after track 13, there is a death-beat metal track with the lyrics "der pork und beans wit sauerkrauten".
- Beyoncé:
  - Dreamgirls: includes the hidden track "Listen"
  - Dangerously in Love: includes the hidden track "Daddy"
  - Beyoncé: Two hidden tracks in between songs: "Ghost" is tracked onto the beginning of the second track, "Haunted", and "Yoncé" is tracked onto the beginning of the sixth track, "Partition".
- Big Audio Dynamite, F-Punk: after track 11, there is a cover of "Suffragette City"
- Big Black, Songs About Fucking: final song "Bombastic Intro" is not listed on the track listing.
- The Black Angels, Directions to See a Ghost: includes the hidden tracks "Surf City (Revisited)" and "Paladin's Last Stand"
- The Black Crowes, Shake Your Money Maker: includes the hidden track "Mercy Sweet Moan (Live Too Fast Blues)"
- The Black Eyed Peas, Elephunk: "Third Eye" at the end of the album.
- Black 47, Home of the Brave: track 47 is a cover of "I Eat Cannibals"
- Black Moth Super Rainbow, Start a People: features a "{Super Secret Track}" after "Smile Heavy". In the bonus-reissue released version, it was revealed that the name was "The Primary Color Movement", which was originally on Electric Avenue, Chapter 8 by Duotone Records.
- Black Rebel Motorcycle Club, Howl: a hidden track follows "The Line" at the end of the album
- Black Sabbath, Sabotage: "Blow on a Jug" follows on from "The Writ", at a much lower volume
- Blessed Union of Souls, Home: the hidden track 12 reprised "I Believe"
- Blind Melon, Soup: features "Hello Goodbye"
- Bluetip, Bluetip: includes an unnamed honky-tonk hidden track
- The Bluetones, "Marblehead Johnson": A rare example of a CD single containing a hidden track, namely the band's rare debut track "Are You Blue or Are You Blind?"
- Blur:
  - Modern Life Is Rubbish (American version): features the hidden tracks "When the Cows Come Home" and "Peach"
  - Blur: At the end of the final track, "Essex Dogs" is a grunge song as the hidden track
  - Think Tank: Contains "Me, White Noise" hidden in the pregap before the first track
- BoDeans, Go Slow Down: hidden track 12 is an acoustic recording of "She's So Fine"
- The Boo Radleys
  - Wake Up!: A hidden food-themed song closes the album, following "Wilder".
  - Kingsize: A clip of Stephen King instructing listeners to switch off their television or radio is hidden before the start of the album.
- Bow Wow, The Price of Fame: includes the hidden track "I am a Flirt"
- David Bowie, David Bowie (1969): the short hidden track "Don't Sit Down", appears as the third track on the original British version and several reissues.
- BoySetsFire, Tomorrow Come Today: includes the hidden track "With Every Intention"
- Brakes, Touchdown: includes the hidden track "First Dance" at the end of the album
- Breaking Benjamin, Saturate: includes the hidden track "Forever"
- Dee Dee Bridgewater, This Is New: includes the hidden track "Mack the Knife"
- Bright Eyes, Letting Off the Happiness: Has a hidden version of "Contrast and Compare" at the end of the album after "Tereza and Thomas".
- Chris Brown, Fortune: includes the hidden track "I Love You"
- James Brown, Star Time: Numerous pre-song mundanities such as count offs and false starts are backwards indexed throughout.
- Jimmy Buffett:
  - Banana Wind: includes a cover of Stephen Stills' "Treetop Flyer" as a hidden track at the end of the album.
  - Christmas Island: Following a long pause after the last song, Jimmy recites "Twas the Night Before Christmas"
- Built to Spill, There's Nothing Wrong With Love: includes a hidden track that makes fun of the album
- Burning Airlines, Mission Control!: includes and hidden track and a sample-based interlude
- Butt Trumpet, Butt Trumpet: includes a seventeen minute long hidden track

== C ==
- C-Murder, Tru Dawgs: A song called "Betya" begins a few seconds after "How A Thug Nigga Like It" fades out.
- Cage the Elephant, Thank You, Happy Birthday: An alternative version of "Right Before My Eyes" is after the last listed track on the album
- Regina Carter, Southern Comfort: the hidden track is "Cornbread Crumbled in Gravy" song by Vera Hall
- Brandi Carlile, The Story: "Hiding My Heart": appears after a brief silence on the final track of her album
- Vanessa Carlton, Harmonium: includes the hidden track "The Wreckage"
- Chaeyoung, Lil Fantasy Vol. 1: physical copies of the album include a hidden track
- Chalk FarM, Notwithstanding: features a hidden track
- Children of Bodom, Blooddrunk: the hidden track is a cover of is "Ghost Riders in the Sky"
- Circa Survive, Juturna: includes the hidden track "House of Leaves"
- CIV, Set Your Goals: includes the hidden track "Blesse"
- Kelly Clarkson, My December: The hidden track "Chivas" plays after the final track
- The Clash, London Calling: "Train in Vain (Stand by Me)" was originally unlisted, because the sleeve had been printed before the song was selected for inclusion.
- Cloud Cult, Advice from the Happy Hippopotamus: included the hidden track called "Bobby's Spacesuit"
- Clutch, The Elephant Riders: each copy of the album contains one of the following hidden songs, which is on the same track as "Dragonfly",: "David Rose", "Gifted & Talented", or "05"
- Roger Clyne and the Peacemakers, Americano!: includes the hidden track "A Little Hungover You".
- Cobalt, Slow Forever: includes the hidden track "Siege"
- Jarvis Cocker, Jarvis: "Running the World" begins at 29:40 of the final track.
- Cold War Kids, Robbers and Cowards: "Sermon vs. the Gospel" begins at 7:20 of the final track.
- Coldplay:
  - Parachutes: "Life is for Living" begins at 5:39 of the final track "Everything's Not Lost".
  - X&Y: "Til Kingdom Come" at the end of the album is an acoustic hidden track.
  - Viva la Vida or Death and All His Friends: "Reign of Love" is a hidden track after "Lovers in Japan"; "Chinese Sleep Chant" begins after "Yes" and "The Escapist" begins after "Death and All His Friends".
  - A Head Full of Dreams: "X Marks the Spot" is the hidden track that begins at 3:25 of "Army of One".
- Nat King Cole, The Christmas Song, included a hidden track in the 1946 original recording
- Collective Soul, Dosage: "She Said" was the hidden track
- Phil Collins, Face Value: includes an a capella version of "Over the Rainbow" as a hidden track
- The Coral, The Coral (2002): includes the hidden track "Time Travel"
- Cormega, The Realness: includes the hidden track "Killaz Theme" featuring Havoc and Prodigy
- Counting Crows, Hard Candy: included the hidden track "Big Yellow Taxi", a cover of the Joni Mitchell song
- Course of Empire, Initiation: "The Gate / Tomorrow" is included after track 10 that sounds different when played in mono
- Cracker:
  - Gentleman's Blues: includes the hidden track "Cinderella"
  - Kerosene Hat: "Eurotrash Girl" and "I Ride My Bike" are hidden tracks 69 and 88, respectively. Track 15 is a collection of noises called "Hi-Desert Biker Meth Lab". Track 88 includes six minutes "about driving and biking", while track 99 is a mono version of "Kerosene Hat".
- Cradle of Filth, The Principle of Evil Made Flesh: "Imperium Tenebrarum" was not listed on the album's cover and there is also a short hidden track after track 4, "Summer Dying Fast".
- Sheryl Crow, The Globe Sessions: "Subway Ride" is a hidden track that follows 38 seconds of silence following the last song "Crash and Burn"
- Crowded House, Woodface: "I'm Still Here" following a long stretch of silence after the last song "How Will You Go"
- The Cure, Three Imaginary Boys: "Untitled" a.k.a. "The Weedy Burton" is track 13, the last track on the album

== D ==
- D12, Devil's Night: There is a hidden track "Girls (Limp Bizkit Diss)" a rap performed by Eminem
- Dead Prez, Let's Get Free: "Propaganda" on track 44, "The Pistol" on track 45.
- Death, The Sound of Perseverance: The final track, a cover of Judas Priest's song, "Painkiller", is not shown on the track listing.
- Deee-Lite, Dewdrops in the Garden: The hidden track 16 is "What is Music", followed by fashion commentary, another song, and a remix of "Bring Me Your Love"
- Deer Tick, Divine Providence: after thirty minutes of silence, there is the hidden track "Mr. Cigarette", with lyrics by Paul Westerberg sung to the tune of "I've Been Working on the Railroad"
- Deftones
  - Adrenaline: includes the hidden track "Fist" after silence at the end of the album.
  - Around the Fur: "Bong Hit" starts at 19:32 after the song "Mx". After the track "Bong Hit" ("Bong Hit" ends at 19:55 minutes), "Damone" starts at 32:40.
- Depeche Mode, Ultra: "Junior Painkiller", an unlisted instrumental track
- Digimon: The Movie soundtrack: At tracks 13, 14, 15, 16, and 17, the "Digimon Theme", "Change Into Power", "Let's Kick It Up", "Going Digital", and "Strange" start playing after "Here We Go" and 59 seconds of silence.
- Dodgy, Homegrown: A 30-second drone-pop reprise of "We Are Together" appears at the end of the album.
- Dr. Dre, The Chronic: includes the hidden track "Bitches Ain't Shit"
- Dramarama, Hi-Fi Sci-Fi: includes the hidden track "Hey Grandpa"
- DRC Music, Kinshasa One Two: includes an untitled hidden track
- Dystopia, Human=Garbage: Untitled track after the last listed track on the album.

== E ==
- Earth to Andy, Simple Machine: the hidden track is a cover of the Beatles's "I Want You (She's So Heavy)"
- Eels, Daisies of the Galaxy: "Mr E's Beautiful Blues" at the end of the album. Although not on the track listing, later versions of the album featured a sticker advertising it as a bonus track.
- Eldritch, El Niño: the hidden track "Nebula Surface" follows the last listed track
- Missy Elliott, Miss E... So Addictive: after the last listed song is a hidden track "Higher Ground," performed by an all-star lineup of gospel singer, including Yolanda Adams and Kim Burrell
- Eminem, Recovery: There is a hidden track, named Untitled, after the final track.
- Enjoy Every Sandwich: Songs of Warren Zevon: after a period of silence, Jorge Calderón and Jennifer Warnes' version of Zevon's "Keep Me in Your Heart", an instrumental version of the same song, arranged by Van Dyke Parks, plays after the last track.
- Evanescence, Fallen: Only available on later versions of the album, the band version of "My Immortal"
- Everclear, So Much for the Afterglow: "Hating You For Christmas" following the final track.
- Everything but the Girl, Amplified Heart: "Missing (Todd Terry Remix)" appears as track 11 but is not listed on the album.
- Evidence, Cats & Dogs, reinvents the hidden track with a "missing" track
- Extreme, Waiting for the Punchline: On some early presses of the album there were only eleven tracks with "Fair Weather Faith" omitted entirely and the title track beginning at the 5:30-point of track 11.
- Exit-13, Smoking Songs: includes a hidden track called "Loading Dock" that appears at 13:00 after the final track.
- Exodus: The Atrocity Exhibition... Exhibit A: the album ends with the hidden track "Bonded by Banjo" or "Banjoed by Blood", a banjo version of their song "Bonded By Blood"

== F ==
- Fall Out Boy, Folie à Deux: includes the hidden track "Lullabye"
- The Fauves, Future Spa: Features the hidden track "Everybody's Getting A Three Piece Together", followed by an amusing police interview of two band members regarding a marijuana arrest and caution.
- Kevin Federline, Playing With Fire: includes the hidden track "Middle Finger"
- Fiction Plane, Everything Will Never Be OK: "Bongo" following the last song "Wise" after five minutes of silence.
- Field Music, Field Music (Measure): an instrumental is the hidden track after the final listed track, also an instrumental
- Five Finger Death Punch, Got Your Six: the hidden tracks is a voicemail from "Jekyll and Hyde"
- Flaw, Through the Eyes: the hidden track is a version of "Only the Strong", featuring only singer Chris Volz playing the piano
- Flowerhead, The People's Fuzz: After track 11, there are 25 minutes of synthesized and nature sounds.
- Steve Forbert, Here's Your Pizza: includes two acoustic hidden tracks
- Frankmusik, Complete Me: physical copies of the album include the hidden track "Olivia"
- Anson Funderburgh and the Rockets, Change in My Pocket: the hidden track is "Key to the Highway"
- The Futureheads, The Chaos: there is an untitled hidden a cappella track

== G ==
- Charlotte Gainsbourg, Rest: that album contains a hidden untitled track thirty seconds after the track "Les Oxalis". It is a recording of Jo, Charlotte Gainsbourg's daughter, singing the alphabet.
- Galactic, Crazyhorse Mongoose: Untitled track hidden after a period of silence on the last track, "Quiet Please".
- Melody Gardot, The Absence: includes the hidden track "Cheque Journeyman"
- Gear Daddies, Billy's Live Bait: hidden track 10 is a live version of "Zamboni"
- God Lives Underwater, Life in the So-Called Space Age: ends with a minimalist, 25-minute outro of a bass tone and beat, followed by an instrumental excerpt of another song
- Godflesh, Hymns: Untitled track follows a minute of silence after the final listed track, "Jesu".
- Goldfinger, Open Your Eyes: includes the hidden track, a fantasy about Wayne Gretzky
- Gordo, Diamante: includes hidden track "Healin" recorded with Drake
- Great Big Sea, Rant and Roar: includes a Celtic hip-hop hidden track
- Vivian Green, Vivian: the hidden track "All About Us" play after the last song
- Green Day, Dookie: includes the hidden track "All By Myself", performed by drummer Tre Cool, who sings and plays acoustic guitar
- Grievous Angels, New City Of Sin: includes a cover of the Sex Pistols "Bodies" as a hidden track.
- Gunplay featuring. Waka Flocka Flame, Ashes to Ashes: After the album's bonus track, there is a minute of silence followed by the hidden track "Rollin'".
- Guns N' Roses, "The Spaghetti Incident?": "Look at Your Game, Girl", originally performed by Charles Manson, at the end of the album.
- Gwendal, "Pan Ha Diskan". The album contains a "12b" track after 2 minutes of the 12th track. It is an instrumental version, without the lead guitar and the hornpipe of the firs track of the album.

== H ==
- John Hyatt, Walk On: After the last song, there are two minutes of train sound effects (instead of silence), followed by the song "Mile High".
- Lauryn Hill, The Miseducation of Lauryn Hill: Following the title track, two unlisted songs, "Can't Take My Eyes Off of You" and "Tell Him" appear as separate tracks. The former became so popular, it was announced on the cover sticker and nominated for a Grammy.
- Catfish Hodge, Bare Necessities: features the hidden track "Rainforest Prayer"
- Tish Hinojosa, Destiny's Gate: The hidden track 12 is a Spanish language version of "Destiny's Gate"
- The Hiss, Panic Movement: includes the hidden track "Shady People"
- Hit the Lights, This Is a Stick Up... Don't Make It a Murder: "Her Eyes Say Yes"
- The Hoosiers, The Trick to Life: includes a hidden track at the end of the album
- Hootie & the Blowfish, Cracked Rear View: The hidden track 12 is an A cappella version of the traditional spiritual "Motherless Child"; track 34 is a hidden track called "Track 34"
- Whitney Houston, My Love Is Your Love: The hidden track is a remake of "I Was Made to Love Him".

== I ==
- Immortal Technique, Revolutionary Vol. 1: an untitled hidden track, featuring Diabolic, appears ten seconds after the end of "Dance with the Devil".
- Insane Clown Posse, Tunnel of Love: includes a hidden track of a skit and a promotional phone number
- Islands, Return to the Sea: includes a ballad hidden track

== J ==
- Janet Jackson:
  - Janet: includes "Whoops Now" at the end of "Sweet Dreams", the outro of the album
  - The Velvet Rope: the hidden track "Can't Be Stopped" is thirty seconds after "The Velvet Rope"
- Mick Jagger, Goddess in the Doorway: An unlisted track plays after the final song, "Brand New Set of Rules"
- Parlor James, Dreadful Sorry: includes the hidden track "Cowboy Song"
- Jamiroquai, Synkronized: "Deeper Underground" is a hidden track
- Jawbox, Jawbox: This album's hidden track is a cover of Tori Amos' song "Cornflake Girl"
- Jawbreaker, Dear You: includes an unlisted final track
- Jeremy Jay, A Place Where We Could Go: includes the hidden track "Oh, Bright Young Things"
- Jay-Z:
  - The Blueprint: After some noise, there are tracks "Breathe Easy" and a remix of "Girls, Girls, Girls".
  - Vol. 3... Life and Times of S. Carter: inclues "Jigga My Nigga" and "Girl's Best Friend" as hidden tracks.
- Jedi Mind Tricks:
  - Legacy of Blood: Following "Before the Great Collapse", the hidden track "The President's Wife" featuring Des Devious plays in an edited format.
  - Visions of Gandhi: includes the hidden tracks "I Against I"
- Freedy Johnston, The Trouble Tree: includes a hidden track, followed thirteen minutes and a remix of the same hidden track
- Juliette and the Licks, Four on the Floor: includes the hidden track "Lucky for You"
- Justice, Audio, Video, Disco (2011): ends with an untitled hidden track

== K ==
- Kelis, Kelis Was Here: includes the hidden track "Fuck Them Bitches"
- Kenickie, Get In: the hidden track "Disco Xmas on the Dole" appears after the last track "Something's Got to Give".
- Alicia Keys, Songs in A Minor: includes the hidden track "Lovin' U"
- Kaki King, Legs to Make Us Longer: includes the hidden track "Nails"
- The Killers, Sawdust: includes a hidden track
- King Crimson
  - Islands: After the final track is a tape of guitarist Robert Fripp rehearsing an orchestra.
  - Larks' Tongues in Aspic: A clip of a musician asking "Could I do one more immediately?" appears after a long fade at the end of the album.
- Kings of Leon, Youth and Young Manhood: the hidden track "Talihina Sky" plays at the end of "Holy Roller Novocaine"
- Kiss, Destroyer: includes "Rock & Roll Party" as a hidden track
- Klaxons, A Bugged Out Mix: includes the hidden track "Think Tank" featuring Phil Daniels
- Korn, Follow the Leader: Two minutes after "My Gift to You" was the hidden track "Earache My Eye"
- Kyuss, Welcome to Sky Valley: includes the hidden track "Lick Doo"

== L ==
- Avril Lavigne, Goodbye Lullaby: An extended version of "Alice", a song Lavigne recorded for Tim Burton's 2010 film Alice in Wonderland, appears as a hidden track on the album.
- Leftfield, Leftism: 30 seconds of a very deep, distant bass sound appear half-a-minute after the end of the final track, "30th Century Poem".
- Adrian Legg: Waiting For a Dancer: Recorded live, "Norah Handley's Waltz" is accessible by rewinding track one, "Ragged Nail"
- The Lemonheads, Come on Feel the Lemonheads, includes "Lenny", "Noise Parts 1-3", "The Amp Went Out", and "High-Speed Idiot Mode", all after track 15.
- John Lennon, Mind Games: include a three second long silent hidden track "Nutopia International Anthem" at the end of side one
- Les Cowboys Fringants, Break Syndical: After a long silence at the end of "Ruelle Laurier", the hidden song "Toune Cachée" plays.
- Les Savy Fav, The Cat and the Cobra: After the final track "Titan" is a live version of the song "Our Coastal Hymn"
- Leona Lewis, Echo: Three minutes after the final track "Lost Then Found" ends, there is a hidden track "Stone Hearts and Hand Grenades", a song by Julian Bunetta and Andrew Frampton.
- Lil Scrappy, Bred 2 Die Born 2 Live: "Oh Yeah (Work)" is a hidden track featuring Sean P and E-40
- Limp Bizkit, Three Dollar Bill, Yall$: "Faith" is followed by a hidden track titled "Stereotype Me"
- Lisa Left Eye Lopes, Supernova: the hidden track "Breathe" follows "A New Star is Born"
- Little Boots, Hands: includes the hidden track "Broken Heart"
- Live, Throwing Copper: the hidden track "Horse" follows the last song on the album
- Longstocking, Once Upon a Time Called Now: includes the hidden track "Radio Agony"
- Love Jones, Here's to the Losers: The saxophone ballad "Solo" comes after track 15.
- Ludacris, Word of Mouf: Jermaine Dupri's and Ludacris's "Welcome To Atlanta" appears right after the last track on the album
- Luna, Penthouse: The hidden track 11 is a French language duet "Bonnie and Clyde" with Laetitia Sadier
- Lyricist Lounge 2: features the hidden track "Legendary Street Team (Remix)" by Kool G Rap and M.O.P.
- Shelby Lynne, Suit Yourself: after the last listed song, the album included the hidden track "Rainy Night in Georgia"

== M ==
- M83, Hurry Up, We're Dreaming: includes the hidden track "Mirror"
- M.I.A., Arular: after a short silence at the end of "Galang", is the hidden track "M.I.A."
- Mac DeMarco, Here Comes the Cowboy: the final track "Bye Bye Bye" includes a hidden track
- Madder Rose, Panic On: The hidden track 99 features fingers snapping and backmasking
- Manic Street Preachers
  - Know Your Enemy: includes the hidden track "We Are All Bourgeois Now" after the final track. It is a cover of a song by McCarthy.
  - Journal for Plague Lovers: includes the hidden track "Bag Lady"
- Mansun, Attack of the Grey Lantern: includes the hidden track "An Open Letter to the Lyrical Trainspotter".
- Marillion:
  - Clutching at Straws has a hidden track that can only be heard when played on a PC with an encryption that steers the web browser to the Marillion website.
  - Afraid of Sunlight: has a hidden track that can only be heard when played on a PC with an encryption that steers the web browser to the Marillion website.
- Laura Marling, Alas, I Cannot Swim includes the hidden track "Your Only Doll".
- Branford Marsalis, Requiem: includes a hidden track, featuring a soprano sax and piano
- Massive Attack, 100th Window: the ninth and final track is titled "Antistar"; after several seconds of silence, the hidden track "LP4" begins.
- Mastodon, Blood Mountain: Josh Homme reads a joking message to the band after several minutes of silence following the album's final track, "Pendulous Skin".
- Material Issue, Goin' Through Your Purse Live in Chicago: Track 4 includes four additional songs.
- Brian May, Another World: includes a hidden track piano piece, "Being on My Own"
- Christian McBride, "Vertical Vision": The album's final track is hidden and is an acoustic bass and electric bass cover of Bill Withers's "Just the Two of Us".
- Paul McCartney:
  - Band on the Run: included the hidden track "Helen Wheels"
  - Off the Ground: After the end of the closing track "C'mon People", an unlisted track called "Cosmically Conscious"
  - Driving Rain: The album contains an uncredited sixteenth track, "Freedom".
- Anne McCue, Roll: includes a nine-minute cover of Jimi Hendrix's "Machine Gun" as a hidden track
- Sarah McLachlan
  - Fumbling Towards Ecstasy: a solo piano version of "Possession" after silence at the end of the album.
  - The Freedom Sessions: a solo piano version of "Hold On" appears a couple of minutes after "Ol' 55".
- Meat Puppets, Too High to Die: includes a hidden remake of "Lake of Fire" (originally on Meat Puppets II)
- Megafaun, "Megafaun (Hometapes)": includes the hidden track akin to a "freak-out barn dance".
- John Mellencamp:
  - Big Daddy: the hidden track is a cover of the Hombres' "Let It All Hang Out"
  - Freedom's Road: Song about George W. Bush titled "Rodeo Clown" at the end of track 10
- Mercury Rev
  - Yerself Is Steam: "Car Wash Hair" appears at track 99, with the last listed track, "Very Sleepy Rivers", being sequenced over 76 three-second tracks followed by 14 silent tracks
  - Deserter's Songs: Untitled track at the end of the album that includes Jonathan Donahue babbling
- Metallica, Garage Inc.: includes a cover of Robin Trower's "Bridge of Sighs" as a hidden track
- Mika, Life in Cartoon Motion (2007): includes the hidden track, "Over My Shoulder"
- Ministry:
  - Houses of the Molé: the hidden track "Psalm 23" is an alternative version of "No W"
  - Cover Up: includes a hidden track that is an A cappella
- The Misfits, American Psycho: includes the hidden track "Hell Night"
- Moka Only, Vermilion: “Speakers" ends at 2:58, Hidden track plays at 3:28 (which is a cover of Tears for Fears song "Head over Heels")
- Modest Mouse: "Sad Sappy Sucker": the hidden track "Classy Plastic Lumber" is inserted as track 4
- Monaco, Music For Pleasure: One minute after the end of "Sedona", begins a brief hidden track: it's an outro message that says "Oi! You can turn it off now".
- Monster Magnet, Dopes to Infinity: includes a digitized video
- Gary Moore, A Different Beat: includes a hidden track
- Allison Moorer, The Hardest Part: includes a hidden track "Cold, Cold Earth" at the end of the album that is about her parents' murder-suicide
- Jason Moran, Ten: includes the hidden track "Nobody" which was the theme for the minstrel star Bert Williams
- Alanis Morissette, Jagged Little Pill: hidden tracks include an alternate take of "You Oughta Know" and "Your House", a solo a cappella song
- The Move, Looking On: The frivolous 90-second closing track, "The Duke of Edinburgh's Lettuce", is unlisted on the sleeve for legal reasons.
- Mudhoney, My Brother the Cow; the hidden track 13 is the whole album played backwards
- Municipal Waste:
  - Waste 'em All: has a final hidden track about flying a kite.
  - The Art of Partying: after the album's last track, is the 35-second-long hidden track "Touch Me Now", sung by drummer Brandon Ferrell
- Kacey Musgraves, Pageant Material: Musgraves' cover of "Are You Sure" by Willie Nelson is a part of track 13, "Fine" the song features vocals from Nelson.
- My Chemical Romance, The Black Parade: Track called "Blood" hidden at the end of the album.

== N ==
- N.E.R.D., Fly or Die: contains the emotive hidden track "Waiting for You"
- Kate Nash, My Best Friend is You: includes the hidden track "My Best Friends Is You"
- Nico, The Frozen Borderline - 1968–1970: the hidden track is alternate version of "Frozen Warnings"
- Nine Inch Nails, Broken: the hidden track 98 is "Physical (You're So)", an Adam and the Ants cover, and hidden track 99 is a cover of "Suck" (a song Trent Reznor originally recorded with Pigface)
- Nirvana:
  - Nevermind: "Endless, Nameless" or "The Noise Jam" appears ten minutes after "Something in the Way".
  - In Utero: "Gallons of Rubbing Alcohol Flow Through the Strip" starts about twenty minutes after the end of "All Apologies"
- No Alternative: This compilation album has the hidden track "Verse Chorus Verse" or "Sappy" by Nirvana
- NOFX, Punk In Drublic: This album has a secret song 3 minutes after the final listed song, "Scavenger Type", consisting of bloopers and outtakes for the track "Punk Guy".

== O ==
- Oasis, Heathen Chemistry: includes the hidden track "The Cage"
- Frank Ocean, Channel Orange: includes the hidden track "Golden Girl"
- The Offspring, Americana: includes "Pretty Fly (Reprise)" as a hidden track.
- Oceansize, Everyone into Position: contains the hidden track "Emp(irical) Error" in the pre-gap before track 1.
- OneRepublic, Dreaming Out Loud: The hidden track is "Apologize (Remix)".
- Kelly Osbourne, Shut Up: includes the hidden track "Papa Don't Preach"
- Ozzy Osbourne, No Rest for the Wicked: 'Hero' is track 9; only eight tracks were listed on early releases of this album.
- Over the Rhine, Eve: After track 11, there is a quiet gap before the hidden track 12, which is about a mother's perfume.

== P ==
- Brad Paisley, Time Well Wasted: There are hidden tracks after the final track, including one with William Shatner
- Palma Violets, 180: includes the hidden track "Brand New Song"
- Papa Roach:
  - Old Friends From Young Years: An unlisted/untitled track, commonly titled "Happy Birthday", plays after a pause after the last track "Thanx".
  - Infest: A softer version of "Tightrope" from the Let 'Em Know EP about a minute after "Thrown Away" has finished.
- Pearl Jam:
  - Lost Dogs: includes the hidden track "4/20/02", after the final track
  - Ten: "Master/Slave" after the final track "Release". The first thirty seconds of the hidden track can also be heard at the beginning of "Once".
  - Yield: an untitled track 8, featuring manipulated steel drums and falsetto vocals, and a hidden track at the end of the album, often called "Hummus", during which is a guitar version of belly dancing music"
- Pennywise, Unknown Road: "Slow Down" after the final track "Clear Your Head"
- Perfect, When Squirrels Play Chicken: include a cover of "Crocodile Rock" as a hidden track
- Pet Shop Boys, Very: Go West: In the album version, at 7:07, after approximately two minutes of silence, "Postscript (I Believe in Ecstasy)", sung by Chris Lowe, can be heard.
- Tom Petty, Full Moon Fever: "Hello CD Listeners", featured on the CD version of this album, is played immediately after "Runnin' Down a Dream"
- Pink:
  - Try This: "Hooker" (only on the explicit version of the album)
  - I'm Not Dead: "I Have Seen the Rain". This song follows thirty seconds of silence after the last track on the album.
- Pink Floyd, Atom Heart Mother: The dripping tap sound at the end of the album was sometimes locked into the inner groove on vinyl editions, so it would play infinitely until the stylus was removed from the vinyl.
- Placebo:
  - Placebo: 9 minutes after the closing track "Swallow" begins the instrumental "H. K. Farewell"
  - Without You I'm Nothing: The hidden track "Evil Dildo" is preceded by the closing track "Burger Queen" and 8 minutes of silence.
  - Black Market Music: "Black Market Blood", is a hidden track, found after "Peeping Tom"
- Primordial, Spirit the Earth Aflame: "To Enter Pagan" at the end of the album.
- Primus, Antipop: After a minute of silence that comes after the final track, "Coattails of a Dead Man", there is a studio version of "The Heckler", from live album Suck on This.
- Prince:
  - Newpower Soul: following many silent tracks, track 49 is the song, "Wasted Kisses".
  - Rave Un2 the Joy Fantastic: includes the hidden track "Prettyman"
  - 20Ten: following many silent tracks, track 77 is the song, "Laydown".
- Pulp, His 'n' Hers: Track 12 is a hidden song about a dysfunctional family.

== Q ==
- Q-Tip, Amplified: After the track "End of Time", is the hidden track "Do It, See It, Be It"
- Queens of the Stone Age:
  - Songs for the Deaf: has a hidden track "Mosquito Song"
  - Lullabies to Paralyze: there is an instrumental hidden track
- The Queers, Later Days and Better Lays: includes a cover of The Beach Boys' "God Only Knows" as a hidden track
- Queen, Made In Heaven: has two hidden tracks "Yeah" which is just a spoken word and "Untilted" (also called "13")

== R ==
- R.E.M.:
  - Green (1988): The Eleventh Untitled Song plays on track 11.
  - Up (1998): "I'm Not Over You" is a hidden track that plays at the end of "Diminished", with Michael Stipe singing and playing acoustic guitar.
- Radiohead, Kid A (2000): Closes with a hidden track akin to orchestral swells.
- Ramones, Adios Amigos (American Version) (1995): "Spider-Man" plays at the end of "Born To Die in Berlin"
- Rascal Flatts, Feels Like Today: features "Skin (Sarabeth)" as a hidden track. This hidden track is notable in that it was actually released as a single.
- Chris Rea, The Best of Chris Rea: track 17 is an instrumental called "Three Little Green Candles"
- Red House Painters, Ocean Beach: There is a hidden acoustic song on track 9 and the hidden track "Drop" at the end of the album.
- The Rembrandts, LP (1995). "I'll Be There for You", the theme for "Friends" television program, originally appeared as a hidden track 15 on the CD
- Res, How I Do (2001): About a minute of silence follows "Tsunami", then the hidden track "Say It Anyway" plays; on the Special Edition CD, "Say It Anyway" plays about a minute after the bonus track, "Toxic You".
- Smokey Robinson, Time Flies When You're Having Fun: includes the hidden track "I Want You Back", a cover of the Jackson 5
- Rolling Stones:
  - Their Satanic Majesties Request (1967): includes the hidden track "We Wish You a Merry Christmas"
  - Dirty Work (1986): Track 11 is an uncredited recording of "Key to the Highway" with a piano solo by Ian Stewart, who died on 12 December 1985 just following Dirty Work's completion.
- The Roots
  - Phrenology: After approximately four minutes of silence at the end of the album, two songs, "Rhymes and Ammo/Thirsty" will play.
  - Things Fall Apart: "Act Fore (The End?)" is the album's unlisted final track
  - The Tipping Point: The hidden track "In Love with the Mic" featured Dave Chappelle, Skillz, and Truck North. There is also a wordless hidden track called "Trommeltanz (Din Daa Daa)", featuring Questlove on drums The UK edition of the album also has a third hidden track, a cover of Booker T. & the M.G.'s "Melting Pot".
- Leon Russell, Legend in My Time: Hank Wilson Vol. III: the hidden track is a 21-minute conversation between Russell and Harold Bradley

== S ==
- Saliva, Survival of the Sickest: after the final listed track, "No Hard Feelings", is the hidden track "Sex, Drugs & Rock N' Roll".
- Scissor Sisters, Ta-Dah: after the last listed track, there is two minutes of silence followed by the hidden track "Transistor".
- Jill Scott, Who Is Jill Scott?: Words and Sounds Vol. 1: After track 17, there are 26 black tracks lasting four seconds each, followed the bonus track 44 "Try", followed by the hidden track "Love Rain" featuring Mos Def
- Semisonic, Feeling Strangely Fine: track 12 is a hidden track
- Sev, Back Rider: include hidden tracks of crank phone calls
- Sex Pistols, The Great Rock 'n' Roll Swindle: includes the hidden track "The Biggest Blow"
- Michelle Shocked:
  - Short Sharp Shocked (1988): An unlisted version of Shocked's "Fogtown"
  - Captain Swing (1989): "Russian Roulette" appears as an unlisted final track.
- Shooting at Unarmed Men, Soon There Will Be: includes a hidden track
- Sing-Sing: The Joy of Sing-Sing (2001): includes the hidden track "Keep It That Way"
- The Skeletones, The Skeletones: Track 13 is a hidden track.
- Slipknot, Slipknot (1999): features the hidden track "Eeyore"
- The Smashing Pumpkins, Gish (1991): "I'm Going Crazy" appears shortly after "Daydream"
- Todd Snider, Songs for the Daily Planet: After track 12 is a hidden track, "Talkin' Seattle Grunge Rock Blues"
- The So So Glos, Dizzy: the hidden track is the band playing "Let's Rock Till We Die" when they were children
- Social Distortion, White Light, White Heat, White Trash (1996): Unlisted track 12 is a cover of "Under My Thumb" by the Rolling Stones
- Songs in the Key of X: Music from and Inspired by the X-Files (1996): includes two pregap hidden tracks, namely "Time Iesum Transeuntem et non Reverendem" by Nick Cave and the Bad Seeds and a remix of The X-Files theme music by the Dirty Three.
- Sonic Youth, Experimental Jet Set, Trash and No Star (1994) there is a hidden instrumental several minutes after "Sweet Shine"
- Southern Culture on the Skids, Plastic Seat Sweat: includes a ten-minute funk instrumental as the hidden track
- Britney Spears: "Oops!... I Did It Again" contains three unlisted skits following the songs "Don't Go Knocking On My Door", "What U See (Is What U Get)", and "When Your Eyes Say It" (US edition) or "Heart" (International edition).
- Bruce Springsteen:
  - Magic (2007): after the last song on the album, there is the hidden track "Terry's Song", written as a memorial to Springsteen's friend, who had died shortly before the album was released.
  - Bruce Springsteen & the E Street Band: Live In New York City: Track 11 on disc 1 is an uncredited version of "Born To Run"
  - The Promise (2010): includes a hidden version of "The Way"
- Squirrel Nut Zippers, Christmas Caravan: includes the hidden track "Hanging Up My Stockings"
- Stanford Prison Experiment, The Gato Hunch: The hidden track 12 is a 28-minute track about the United States as a business-run society
- Rod Stewart, Every Picture Tells a Story: includes the hidden track "Amazing Grace", featuring Ronnie Wood on slide guitar
- The Stone Roses, Second Coming (1994): "The Foz", following a long string of empty four second tracks on the CD, a discordant instrumental sea shanty that is roughly six minutes (track 90, sometimes track 32)
- Stone Temple Pilots, Purple (1994): About twelve seconds after the last listed track is the hidden track "Second Album", a 1985 song by Richard Peterson.
- Styx, The Serpent Is Rising (1973): "Plexiglas Toilet" - hidden track after "As Bad as This" on side one.
- The Subdudes, Miracle Mule: The title track, "Miracle Mule", is a hidden track.
- Super Furry Animals, Guerrilla (1999): Features a hidden track in the pregap as well as a noisy, one-bar reprise of "Chewing Chewing Gum" seven minutes after the end of the album.
- Suede, Dog Man Star (1994): The hidden track 13 is a sad story about modern life.
- Sugar, Besides: includes a computer playable video of "Gee Angel"
- The Supersuckers, La Mano Cornuto: The hidden track 14 plays the entire album over again.
- Swollen Members: Heavy (2003): includes the hidden track "Sensational Breed" featuring Son Doobie

== T ==
- T Power, The Self-Evident Truth Of An Intuitive Mind (1995): After the conclusion of the final listed track, "Amber", is a 19-minute backwards indexed track, containing eight minutes of silence and then ten minutes of unusual sounds, which leads into the bassy, unlisted tenth track.
- Tally Hall, Marvin's Marvelous Mechanical Museum (2005): The tracks "Hidden in the Sand" and "13" are not listed on the physical releases of the album, being placed at track number 15 and 13 respectively.
- The Tea Party, The Edges of Twilight (1995): "The Edge of Twilight" (after "Walk With Me" features Irish singer Roy Harper on spoken word), much later on the same track, a sample of a microphone being dropped during a take of the song "Correspondences" can be heard.
- Tears for Fears, Songs from the Big Chair (1985): After the song "Head Over Heels", there is a live reprise of the previous track, "Broken", which is not listed on the original vinyl LP. This hidden track is listed on the CD pressing.
- Teenage Fanclub, Thirteen: includes six hidden tracks, including B-sides from singles and a cover of "Chords of Flame"
- Teddy Thompson, Teddy Thompson: hidden track is a cover of the Everly Brothers' "The Price of Love"
- Terrorvision, Shaving Peaches: The hidden tracks tells listeners to "travel home safely" to the background of a stylaphone.
- Therapy?, Troublegum: hidden track is a cover of "You Are My Sunshine".
- They Might Be Giants, Factory Showroom: The hidden track "Token Back to Brooklyn" is found by rewinding the CD to track zero. On the vinyl release, it is an unlisted final track, which plays after 75 seconds of silence following "The Bells Are Ringing". On streaming, the track is removed from the album entirely.
- Third Eye Blind:
  - Blue (1999): after a very lengthy silence at the end of the album, a reprisal of "The Red Summer Sun" appears that continues after the original version's fade-out. Then the band members breathe into the microphones for a few seconds and laugh.
  - Out of the Vein (2003): "Another Life" begins at 18:53 after track 13 "Good Man".
  - This Is All Yours (2014): Hidden Track of Lovely Day beginning at 12:00 of Leaving Nara.
- Teddy Thompson, Separate Ways: includes a hidden cover of the Everly Brothers' "Take a Message to Mary" as a duet with Linda Thompson
- Paul Thorn: Hammer + Nail (1997): includes the hidden track "Josie" about a Jehovah's Witness stripper"
- Tilly and the Wall, Wild Like Children (2004): "The Ice Storm, Big Gust, and You" (untitled song, unofficially called "Some Names" by several fans).
- Justin Timberlake, The 20/20 Experience – 2 of 2: "Pair of Wings" after "Not a Bad Thing" ends.
- Tinie Tempah, Demonstration: features a hidden track after the last listed song
- Tindersticks, Curtains: includes the hidden track "A Marriage Made in Heaven", a remake of a 1993 song with guest Isabella Rossellini
- TISM:
  - Form and Meaning Reach Ultimate Communion: country version of "Defecate on My Face" at track 6.
  - Machiavelli and the Four Seasons: a cappella "Phillip Glass's Arse" after one minute of silence after the final track.
- The Tony Danza Tapdance Extravaganza, Danza III: The Series of Unfortunate Events (2010): Hidden track about ten minutes after "12-21-12".
- Tool:
  - Opiate (1992): includes the hidden track "The Gaping Lotus Experience"
  - Undertow (1993): Although the song "Disgustipated" is listed on the back cover as track 10, tracks 10-68 are blank and "Disgustipated" is track 69
  - Salival (2000): "Maynard's Dick" appears after the last track, "L.A.M.C", on the audio CD.
  - Lateralus (2001): "Faaip de Oiad", even though listed on the album, starts immediately on track 13, but there's a gap consisting of two minutes of silence between that track and its predecessor ("Triad").
- Travis, The Man Who (1999): includes the hidden track "Blue Flashing Light"
- Jen Trynin, Cockamamie: The hidden track 13 includes "I know what it's like to feel down"
- Turin Brakes, Ether Song (2003): The title track of this album is hidden and starts three and half minutes after final track "Rain City"
- TV on the Radio, Young Liars (2003): The unlisted final track is an a cappella rendition of the Pixies song "Mr Grieves".
- Twin Shadow, Confess: includes the hidden track "Mirror in the Dark" at the end of the album

== U ==
- U2
  - Zooropa: A 30-second ringing alarm sound appears half-a-minute after the final song, "The Wanderer".
  - The Best of 1980–1990: "October" appears a minute after "All I Want Is You". The song was originally found on their 1981 album of the same name and, despite being a hidden track, represents the album's only representation on the album.
- UNKLE:War Stories: 'Tired of Sleeping' is found after the last track
- Keith Urban, Golden Road: the hidden track "One Chord Song" is at the end of the album
- Urge Overkill, Saturation: Twenty minutes after "Heaven 90210", there is "Dumb Song Take 9" or "Do the Scrawl".

== V ==
- The Vaccines, What Did You Expect from the Vaccines? (2011): includes the hidden track "Somebody Else's Child"
- Van Halen, Women and Children First (1980): "Growth" is an eighteen second hidden track, immediately after the song "In a Simple Rhyme"
- Ben Vaughn, Rambler 65: features a hidden track in the style of the Beach Boys
- The Verve, Urban Hymns (1997): "Deep Freeze" at the 13-minute mark of "Come On", which features a baby crying and off-key string instruments.
- The Von Bondies, Pawn Shoppe Heart (2004): includes an untitled hidden track

== W ==
- Tom Waits:
  - Real Gone: includes a final hidden track "Chick a boom" in A cappella
  - Orphans: Brawlers, Bawlers, and Bastards: includes two hidden tracks that are recordings of Waits' live show monologs
- The Wallflowers:
  - Breach: features a lullaby as a hidden track
  - Red Letter Days: includes the hidden track "Empire in My Mind", written as the theme song for the television show The Guardian
- Joe Walsh, But Seriously Folks: A few seconds after "Life's Been Good", there is a track called "A Flock of Waa-Waa's".
- Justin Warfield
  - My Field Trip to Planet 9: After a silence at the end of the album are a series of answering machine messages shared between Warfield and Prince Paul, followed respectively by a recording operator message, incessant bleeps, a percussive sitar loop, lapping waves, a bubbling bong and a record needle scratching vinyl.
  - The Justin Warfield Supernaut: features a hidden upbeat jam comparable to Lenny Kravitz
- Kanye West:
  - Late Registration: The track "Late" is the last track and is hidden; it appears right after a listed bonus cut.
  - 808s and Heartbreak: An unlisted live freestyle in Singapore called "Pinocchio Story" appears as the final track on the album.
- Paul Westerberg, Stereo (2002): includes a hidden cover of Flesh For Lulu's 1 "Postcards From Paradise"
- Whipping Boy, Heartworm: Has a hidden track when the singer says he has a terminal illness.
- Whiskeytown, Faithless Street: includes a hidden track at the end of the album
- Jack White, Lazaretto: included hidden tracks recorded at 45 and 78 rpm within "Just One Drink" These are located under the paper label on the album's second side.
- White Zombie, Astro-Creep: 2000: "Where the Sidewalk Ends, the Bug Parade Begins" starts nine minutes after "Blood, Milk and Sky".
- The Who, The Who Sell Out: At the end of the album is an infinite loop featuring voices repeating the words "Track Records", the Who's record label, over and over.
- David Wilcox, What You Whispered: includes the hidden track "Soul Song"
- Pharrell Williams, G I R L: includes the hidden track "Freq"
- Robbie Williams:
  - Life thru a Lens (1997): "Hello Sir" follows after ten minutes of silence following the final track, "Baby Girl Window". "Hello Sir" features as a hidden track in the same fashion on the US compilation album, The Ego Has Landed.
  - Sing When You're Winning (2001): a hidden track is found 25 minutes after "Road To Mandalay"
  - Rudebox (2006): The profanity-heavy "Dickhead" closes the album as a hidden track.
- Gretchen Wilson, All Jacked Up: "Good Morning Heartache" is the hidden track
- Winterpills, The Light Divides (2007): includes a second, radio friendly version of "Broken Arm" as the hidden track
- Lee Ann Womack, There's More Where That Came From (2005), features a hidden track "Just Someone I Used to Know".
- The World Is a Beautiful Place & I Am No Longer Afraid to Die, Harmlessness (2015): includes a hidden track at the end of "Mount Hum"
- Wu-Tang Clan, The W: The final track on the album was the hidden song, "The Clap" with Ghostface Killah, Method Man, Raekwon, and U-God.

== X ==
- X, Beyond and Back: The X Anthology: includes two hidden tracks at the end of disk 1.
- The X-Files: The Album: contains a spoken word track at 10:13 (homage to Ten Thirteen) of Chris Carter explaining the show's conspiracy

== Y ==
- "Weird Al" Yankovic, Off the Deep End: After the last track, "You Don't Love Me Anymore", there are ten minutes of silence, followed by a brief, loud snippet of unintelligible shouting and random instrumental noises, entitled "Bite Me". Since this album's cover and first track are parodies of Nirvana's Nevermind cover and first track "Smells Like Teen Spirit", this hidden track is a fitting tribute to the hidden track "Endless, Nameless" which is hidden in the same way on some pressings of Nevermind.
- Yeah Yeah Yeahs, Fever to Tell (2003): "Poor Song", also known as "Hidden Song", is a hidden track that starts at 4:24 of track 11.
- Yes:
  - Tormato: the track "Richard" was included at the end of the album on early copies of the original UK cassette and 8-track
  - Open Your Eyes: An untitled track, consisting of nature sounds and vocal snippets of the songs from the album, is heard after the album's final track "The Solution".
- Dwight Yoakam, Under the Covers: the hidden track is "T for Texas"
- Pete Yorn, Musicforthemorningafter: "A Girl Like You" follows the final track "Simonize"
- You Am I, Hourly, Daily: "Forget It Sister" is an unlisted track that appears on the final track, "Who Takes Who Home (Goodnight)", after a period of silence.

== Z ==
- Zeus: 07 (2007): Track called "Raw" appearing in the pre-gap.
- Ziggy Marley and the Melody Makers, Spirit of Music (1999): untitled song on the same track as "Jah Will Be Done".
- ZOX, Take Me Home (2003): contains a bonus track found by rewinding the CDs as soon as the first song begins.

== See also ==
- List of backmasked messages
- List of albums with tracks hidden in the pregap
- Lists of albums
