= Lists of albums =

This is a list of lists of albums.

Article	Summary
List of albums containing a hidden track	Lists albums that contain a hidden track and also information on how to find them. A hidden track is a piece of music that has been placed on a CD, audio cassette, vinyl record or other recorded medium in such a way as to avoid detection by the casual listener.
List of albums which have spent the most weeks on the UK Albums Chart	Lists albums which have spent the longest number of weeks in the UK Albums Chart, as recorded by the Official Charts Company. This comprises a top 100 from August 1981 onwards, a top 75 before this from 1978 and various lengths before this from July 1956.
List of albums titled Live	Lists albums entitled "Live" or with a similar name.
List of albums with tracks hidden in the pregap	Lists albums that include unlisted hidden tracks in the pregap of the CD version.
List of best-selling albums	Lists albums with the highest sales figure reported for each of them. Groupings are based on different sales benchmarks, the highest being for claims of at least 40 million copies and the lowest being for claims of 20–29 million copies.
List of best-selling albums of 2013	Lists the best-selling albums of the year 2013.
List of best-selling albums of 2014	Lists the best-selling albums of the year 2014.
List of best-selling hip-hop albums of the 2010s in the United States	Lists 2010s hip-hop albums with the highest sales figures in the United States.
List of B-side compilation albums	Lists compilations albums that contains B-sides.
List of chamber pop albums	Lists chamber pop albums in release order.
List of concept albums	Lists concept albums produced by bands and solo artists across all music genres.
List of country rock albums	Lists country rock albums in a chronological order.
List of double albums	Lists double albums, in which the initial release of the album includes two (or more) LP records or compact discs.
List of emo pop albums	Lists emo pop albums in a chronological order.
Lists of fastest-selling albums	Lists albums with the highest sales in their first week of release.
List of greatest hits albums	Lists albums titled "Greatest Hits," or with a similar title such as "The Very Best Of."
List of grunge albums	Lists albums described as "grunge" by AllMusic. They appear on at least one cited album list and have an article on Wikipedia.
List of longest gaps between studio albums	Lists the longest gaps between studio albums.
List of pop punk albums	Lists pop punk albums in a chronological order.
List of power pop albums	Lists power pop albums in a chronological order.
List of punk compilation albums	Lists notable punk compilation albums.
List of punk rock albums	Lists notable or influential albums in the history of punk rock. It has been derived by compiling lists from professional reviews.
List of rock albums	Lists rock albums that are particularly notable or influential. It has been derived by compiling lists published by professional sources. Each album has appeared in at least one notable list describing the most influential rock and roll albums.
List of tribute albums	Lists tribute albums, organized according to the original artists.
List of triple albums	Lists triple albums, in which the initial release of the album includes three LP records or compact discs.
Lists of UK Albums Chart number ones	Lists the number-one hits in the UK Albums Chart, from its inception in 1956 to the present. The sources are the Record Mirror chart from 1956 to the end of 1958, the Melody Maker chart from November 1958 to March 1960, the Record Retailer chart from March 1960 to March 1972 and the Music Week chart from then onwards. In January 1989 the compilation album chart started, and compilation albums were excluded from the main chart.
Walt Disney Records discography	Lists soundtrack albums from Disney films.

== See also ==
- Lists of songs
