= Pregap =

Data contained a compact disc in track index zero

The pregap on a Red Book audio CD is the portion of the audio track that precedes "index 01" for a given track in the table of contents (TOC). The pregap ("index 00") is typically two seconds long and usually, but not always, contains silence. Popular uses for having the pregap contain audio are live CDs, track interludes, and hidden songs in the pregap of the first track.

== Unconventional uses of the pregap ==
=== Hidden audio tracks ===
On certain CDs, such as Light Years by Kylie Minogue, HoboSapiens by John Cale, or Factory Showroom by They Might Be Giants, the pregap before track 1 contains a hidden track. The track is truly hidden in the sense that most conventional standalone players and software CD players will not see it.

Such hidden tracks can be played by playing the first song and "rewinding" (more accurately, seeking in reverse) until the actual start of the whole CD audio track.

Not all CD drives can properly extract such hidden tracks. Some drives will report errors when reading these tracks, and some will seem to extract them properly, but the extracted file will contain only silence.

Other CDs contain additional audio information in the pre-gap area of other tracks, resulting in the audio only being heard on a conventional CD player if the CD is allowed to "play through," but not if you jump to the next track.

Of the latter technique, also known as 'backwards indexing', Stylus Magazine cite the James Brown box set Star Time (1991) as a pioneering example, believing it played "a key role in the hidden track evolution once it hit CD." Specifically, Star Time backwards indexes pre-song mundanities such as count ins, false starts and muttering from Brown. Stylus also believe this "nifty device" was effectively employed on the 1995 CD version of the Who's The Who Sell Out to "accommodate the little 'ad jingles' that made the original LP so unique."

Some CDs also contain phantom tracks consisting of only index 0 data, meaning the track can only be played on a conventional CD player by allowing the CD to play through a previous track to the next track.

== Pregaps in CD-R media ==
=== OS support ===
Mac OS X:

Currently does not support more than a 2-second pre-gap in the first track under its CD burning utilities. Using a combination of Roxio Toast and a custom .cue file can provide a way around this.

Ripping of pregap audio is supported by the application X Lossless Decoder.

Windows:

- Exact Audio Copy provides the functionality to write to Index 0

Linux:

- cdrecord supports writing any kind of pregap
- cdrdao supports writing any kind of pregap
- K3B, a frontend for several CD/DVD burning/ripping utilities, supports hiding the first track in the pregap of the second one.

== See also ==
- List of albums with tracks hidden in the pregap
- Hidden track
- List of albums containing a hidden track
