= The Shelter (Detroit) =

Music venue

Coordinates: 42.33234°N 83.04155°W

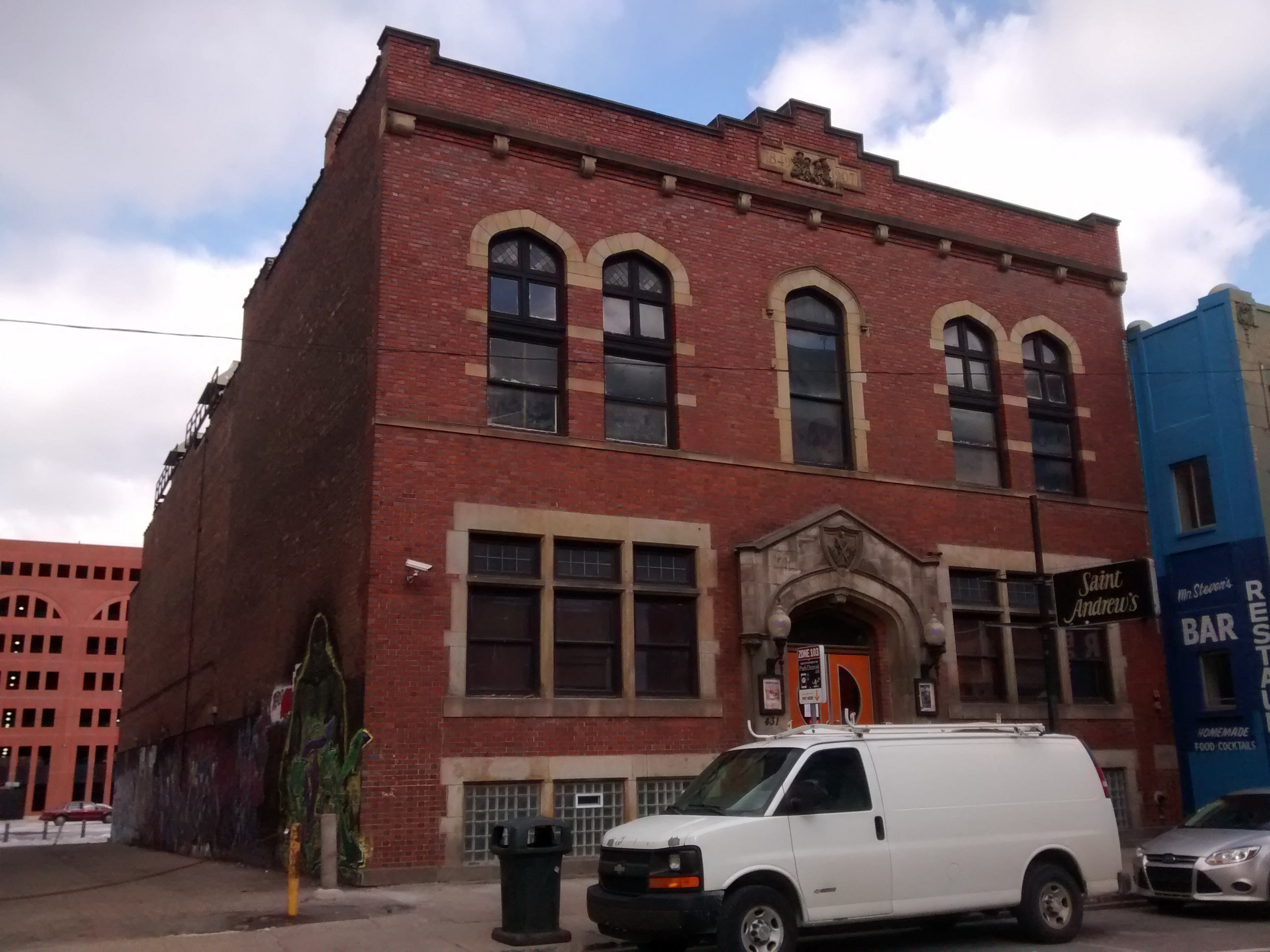
- Exterior view of venue (2016)
- Interactive map of The Shelter
- Address: 431 E Congress St; Detroit, MI 48226-2912
- Location: Bricktown Historic District
- Operator: Live Nation
- Capacity: 400

Website
- Venue Website

The Shelter is a music venue in Detroit, Michigan. It is located below Saint Andrew's Hall at 431 E. Congress St. A venue of the same name is featured in the film 8 Mile. Many notable performers have visited and made presentations at The Shelter, like Eminem, John Mayer, and Deftones.

== History ==
The Shelter Detroit started as a basement location that served as a place to gather and appreciate the growth of Early Techno music. While being under Saint Andrew's Hall (Detroit) especially during the early 90's, the venue hosted concerts, shows, welcomed many DJ's like Jeff Mills, Derrick May (musician), Kevin Saunderson.

One recurring event was Hip Hop Nights, which featured performances by local artists and DJs. The event provided performers with an opportunity to showcase their work and participate in the local hip-hop scene.

African American music and culture has influenced The Shelter, who carried on its legacy.

== Noted performers ==
- Eminem
- John Mayer
- All Time Low
- Ally Brooke
- Arkells
- Big Wreck
- Eisley
- Daya
- Deftones
- Queens of the Stone Age
- The Hives
- Suicide Silence
- Ghostemane
- Haley Reinhart
- Lil Peep
- Local H
- Richie Hawtin
- Poppy
- Local H
- Limblifter
- Slum Village
- Stanford Prison Experiment (band)
