= Mesa Amphitheatre =

Concert venue in Mesa, Arizona

Coordinates: 33.420786°N 111.829619°W

Mesa Amphitheater
- Interactive map of Mesa Amphitheater
- Address: 263 North Center Street Mesa, AZ 85201
- Seating type: lawn
- Capacity: 4,950
- Type: Amphitheatre

Construction
- Opened: 1979

Website
- www.mesaamp.com/Online/

Mesa Amphitheatre is an outdoor concert venue with lawn seating located in Mesa, Arizona. It opened in 1979 and has a maximum capacity of 4,950 people.

The amphitheatre has kept its original design since opening and has become a popular destination for small and big acts alike.

Located in central Mesa, the venue has a tiered lawn with no fixed seating, allowing views of the stage from multiple levels.

== Concerts ==
List of Concerts
- Utopia – May 19, 1980
- The Allman Brothers Band – August 8, 1980, with Papa John Creach, August 6, 1989, June 4, 1993, July 7, 1995 and July 27, 1999, with The Susan Tedeschi Band
- Al Stewart – September 12, 1980
- The Pretenders – September 6, 1981
- Frank Zappa – October 10, 1981
- Rick Springfield – March 12, 1982, with The Innocents
- The Clash – June 13, 1982, with The English Beat
- Elvis Costello & The Attractions – July 25, 1982, with The Jetzons, September 14, 1983 and May 17, 1994, with The Crash Test Dummies
- The Jerry Garcia Band – October 30, 1982, with Bobby and the Midnites
- Mahogany Rush – February 2, 1983
- Roxy Music – May 4, 1983, with Berlin
- Adam Ant – May 13, 1983, with INXS
- Joan Armatrading – June 27, 1983, with David Bromberg
- Meat Loaf & His Neverland Express – August 15, 1983
- The Animals – August 27, 1983
- Billy Idol – March 10, 1984
- The Michael Schenker Group – March 25, 1984
- Saxon – April 11, 1984, with Accept
- King Crimson – June 10, 1984
- David Gilmour – June 19, 1984
- Ratt – August 4, 1984, with Fastway and Mama's Boys
- Air Supply – April 11, 1985
- Simple Minds - April 13, 1986 with The Call (band).
- Santana – August 4, 1985, October 1, 1986, October 7, 1988, September 2, 1991, June 3, 1994, with The Robert Cray Band and May 27, 1995
- The Smiths – August 30, 1986, with Phranc
- George Thorogood & The Destroyers – September 22, 1986
- R.E.M. – September 23, 1986, with Guadalcanal Diary
- Steve Winwood – October 15, 1986, with Howard Jones
- New Order – October 29, 1986 and April 25, 1989, with Throwing Muses
- Europe - April 24, 1987
- Howard Jones – May 13, 1987 and July 13, 1989
- The Cure – July 18, 1987
- Love and Rockets – May 6, 1988 and July 17, 1989, with The Godfathers
- The Beach Boys – May 20, 1988
- Hall & Oates – July 25, 1988
- Bob Dylan – July 30, 1988, September 12, 1990 and October 20, 1996, with The Kenny Wayne Shepherd Band
- Bryan Ferry – September 13, 1988
- Jimmy Page – September 17, 1988
- Midnight Oil – November 7, 1988
- Eddie Money – March 24, 1989
- The Violent Femmes – June 3, 1989
- Public Image Ltd – November 11, 1989
- Great White – March 3, 1990, with The McAuley Schenker Group and Havana Black
- Alice Cooper – April 10, 1990 and August 26, 1997, with Dokken, Slaughter and Warrant
- Tracy Chapman – May 22, 1990
- The Red Hot Chili Peppers – June 1, 1990, with The Meat Puppets
- David Byrne – June 6, 1990
- The Ramones – August 6, 1990, with The Tom Tom Club and October 18, 1992, with Social Distortion
- Melissa Etheridge – September 13, 1990 and August 27, 1992
- Dio – September 25, 1990, with Love/Hate and Cold Sweat
- The Don't Waste Arizona Benefit Concert – December 14, 1990
- The Black Crowes – June 12, 1991, with Jellyfish, October 17, 1992, with The Urban Shakedancers and May 23, 1995, with The Dirty Dozen Brass Band
- Siouxsie and the Banshees – February 7, 1992
- Roxette – March 15, 1992
- Live – March 24, 1992, with Blind Melon
- Pearl Jam – May 9, 1992, with Tribe After Tribe and November 6–7, 1993, with The Butthole Surfers and Bill Miller
- The Beastie Boys – August 2, 1992, with The House of Pain and L7 and Ken Bialobrzeski and Jason Gabriel
- Sonic Youth – September 27, 1992, with The Meat Puppets
- Morrissey – November 1, 1992
- Black Sabbath – November 10, 1992, with Exodus and Skew Siskin
- The Stone Temple Pilots – June 30, 1993, with The Butthole Surfers and The Flaming Lips and June 13, 2000
- REO Speedwagon – July 4, 1993
- Cypress Hill – September 15, 1993 and July 24, 2014, with Stephen Marley
- Robert Plant – October 19, 1993
- Jethro Tull – November 9, 1993
- Primus – November 20, 1993, with The Melvins, August 22, 1995, with Mike Watt, November 14, 1997, with Limp Bizkit and M.I.R.V., December 9, 2006, with Gogol Bordello and October 20, 2011
- The Cocteau Twins – April 9, 1994
- 311 – July 10, 1994, January 27, 1996, May 24, 2000, with Incubus, October 28, 2001, with Alien Ant Farm, July 19, 2003, with Something Corporate, August 3, 2005, with Unwritten Law and A Change of Pace, September 7, 2006, with The Wailers Band and Pepper and August 28, 2012, with Slightly Stoopid and SOJA
- Soundgarden – July 18, 1994 and November 29, 1996
- Helmet – July 27, 1994, with The Rollins Band and Sausage
- Danzig – November 12, 1994, with Type O Negative and Godflesh and May 2, 2003, with Opeth and Nile
- Tool – November 19, 1994 and November 1, 1996, with Cows
- Phish – December 9, 1994
- Bad Religion – February 25, 1995, with Guttermouth and SNFU, March 29, 2002, with Less Than Jake and Hot Water Music and August 29, 2014, with The Offspring, Pennywise and Stiff Little Fingers
- Sarah McLachlan – March 4, 1995 and November 28, 1997
- Steve Perry – March 11, 1995
- Slayer – March 12, 1995, with Machine Head and Biohazard, May 1, 1999, with Meshuggah and Sick of It All, August 7, 2002, with Soulfly and In Flames and July 21, 2006, with Lamb of God, Children of Bodom, Mastodon and Thine Eyes Bleed
- The Dave Matthews Band – May 14, with Big Head Todd and the Monsters and August 3, with Dionne Farris, 1995
- Ozzy Osbourne – October 30, 1995, with Fear Factory
- Blues Traveler – November 19, 1995
- RatDog – December 3, 1995, with The Edwin McCain Band
- Alanis Morissette – January 6, 1996
- Jackson Browne – March 6, 1996
- Ministry – May 11, 1996, with The Jesus Lizard and Laika & The Cosmonauts
- The Butthole Surfers – July 1, 1996, with The Supersuckers, The Toadies and The Reverend Horton Heat
- Crosby, Stills & Nash – August 14, 1996
- Girls Against Boys – September 26, 1996, with The Stanford Prison Experiment
- Alan Parsons – October 14, 1996
- The G3 Tour – October 15, 1996
- ZZ Top – November 13, 1996, with The Reverend Horton Heat
- Pantera – February 9, with Clutch and Neurosis and November 12, with Anthrax and Coal Chamber, 1997 and February 2, 2001, with Soulfly and Morbid Angel
- KoЯn – March 6, 1997, with Limp Bizkit and Helmet
- Megadeth – June 13, 1997 and June 6, 1998, with Sevendust
- Sammy Hagar – August 29, 1997
- Sheryl Crow – September 10, 1997, with Wilco and Michael Penn
- Jane's Addiction – December 4, 1997, with Goldie
- Clutch – March 21, 1998
- Everclear – May 22, 1998, with Marcy Playground and Fastball
- Widespread Panic – May 27, 1998, with G. Love & Special Sauce and Galactic
- Petra – September 19, 1998
- Bauhaus – September 24, 1998 and November 3, 2005
- The Deftones – November 6, 1998, October 27, 2000, with Incubus and Taproot, November 1, 2003, with Clutch, Poison the Well and Denali, May 11, 2007, with The Fall of Troy and June 9, 2011, with The Dillinger Escape Plan and Le Butcherettes
- Rob Zombie – November 27, 1998, with Fear Factory and Monster Magnet, March 12, 2002, with The Damned and April 27, 2006, with Lacuna Coil and Bullet for My Valentine
- Seal – May 29, 1999
- Hole – June 2, 1999, with Queens of the Stone Age
- Limp Bizkit – June 26, 1999, with Kid Rock & Twisted Brown Trucker and Staind
- Sting – October 31, 1999
- Blink-182 – November 2, 1999, with Silverchair and Fenix TX
- Creed – November 7, 1999, with Oleander
- Queensrÿche – November 10, 1999, with doubleDrive
- Godsmack – November 17, 1999, with Reveille
- Kid Rock & Twisted Brown Trucker – December 2, 1999, with Powerman 5000
- Beck – April 22, 2000, with Cafe Tacuba
- The Smashing Pumpkins – May 19, 2000
- No Doubt – August 2, 2000, with Lit
- Linkin Park – April 17, 2001
- Green Day – July 24, 2001, with The Living End
- 3 Doors Down – July 29, 2001, with Lifehouse and Tantric and September 7, 2003, with Our Lady Peace and Seether
- Incubus – November 25, 2001 and September 5, 2007, with The Bravery and Simon Dawes
- System of a Down – February 15, 2002, with Clutch and Mindless Self Indulgence
- Third Day – March 1, 2002
- The Jars of Clay – May 6, 2002
- Garbage – May 29, 2002, with The White Stripes and Abandoned Pools
- Nickelback – May 30, 2002, with Jerry Cantrell and Default
- John Mayer – August 21, 2002, with Guster and The John Butler Trio
- Moby – August 22, 2002
- Jimmy Eat World – October 4, 2002, with The Donnas
- The Strokes – November 10, 2002, with The Moldy Peaches and March 21, 2006
- Insane Clown Posse – February 16, 2003 and November 9, 2004
- Audioslave – March 14, 2003, with The Burning Brides
- The Honda Civic Tour – June 3, 2003, June 8, 2004 and April 13, 2008
- The Nintendo Fusion Tour – August 6, 2003 and October 26, 2005
- The White Stripes – September 26, 2003, with The Soledad Brothers
- Staind – November 4, 2003, with Sevendust and Lo-Pro, November 18, 2005, with P.O.D., Taproot and Flyleaf and May 10, 2006, with Three Days Grace
- The Jägermeister Music Tour – November 20, 2003 and May 7, 2004
- Something Corporate – March 20, 2004, with Yellowcard, The Format and Steriogram
- The Offspring – April 20, 2004, with The (International) Noise Conspiracy and theStart and June 1, 2009, with The Alkaline Trio and The Street Dogs
- Common – August 26, 2004, with Slightly Stoopid and Damian Marley
- O.A.R. – August 31, 2004, with Guster and Matt Nathanson
- Guster – September 1, 2004
- Yes – September 14, 2004, with Dream Theater
- The Pixies – September 20, 2004, with The Distillers and September 24, 2010, with The Fuck Buttons
- The Used – October 12, 2004, with Atreyu, Head Automatica and The Bronx and May 9, 2008, with Straylight Run, The Street Drum Corps and Army of Me
- Good Charlotte – November 1, 2004, with Sum 41 and July 21, 2008, with Boys Like Girls, Metro Station and The Maine
- Yellowcard – November 24, 2004
- Modest Mouse – February 15, 2005, with Mason Jennings and May 12, 2007, with Man Man
- The Taste of Chaos Tour – April 2, 2005 and February 17, 2006
- The Sounds of the Underground Music Festival – July 20, 2005, July 26, 2006 and August 5, 2007
- Dropping Daylight – September 20, 2005
- My Chemical Romance – September 27, 2005, with The Alkaline Trio and Reggie and the Full Effect
- MxPx – November 16, 2005, with Relient K and Rufio
- Spoon – November 19, 2005, with Earlimart, The Black Heart Procession, The Mates of State, Apollo Sunshine and Hellogoodbye
- Flogging Molly – March 17, 2006, March 17, with The Street Dogs and Twopointeight and 18, with Voodoo Glow Skulls and Authority Zero, 2007 and March 17, 2008, with The Cherry Cokes and The Reverend Payton's Big Damn Band
- Avenged Sevenfold – May 2, 2006, with Coheed and Cambria and Eighteen Visions
- HIM – June 6, 2006, with Aiden
- Dashboard Confessional – July 15, with Say Anything and Ben Lee and October 13, with Brand New, 2006
- Taking Back Sunday – July 18, 2006, with Angels & Airwaves, Head Automatica and The Subways
- Ozomatli – August 17, 2006, with Ziggy Marley and Bunny Wailer and August 15, 2007, with Slightly Stoopid and G. Love & Special Sauce
- Gomez – September 13, 2006, with Matisyahu and The Street Drum Corps
- Atreyu – October 7, 2006, with Chiodos
- Nonpoint – October 21, 2006, with Earshot
- Death Cab for Cutie – December 2, 2006, with OK Go, Jenny Lewis and The Watson Twins and June 19, 2008, with Rouge Wave
- Albert Cummings – February 25, 2007
- Killswitch Engage – March 16, 2007, with Chimaira, DragonForce and He Is Legend
- Bright Eyes – May 9, 2007
- Hinder – July 31, 2007, with Papa Roach, Buckcherry and The Exies
- The Paid Dues Music Festival – August 10, 2007
- Rise Against – September 6, 2007, with Silverstein and The Comeback Kid
- Muse – September 20, 2007, with Juliette and the Licks and Immigrant
- KEDJ 103.9's How The Edge Stole Christmas Concert – December 6, 2007
- Blake Shelton – March 9, 2008
- The Gigantour – May 22, 2008
- Erykah Badu – June 14, 2008, with The Roots
- Paramore – August 2, 2008, with Jack's Mannequin and Phantom Planet
- Slightly Stoopid – September 5, 2008, with Pepper, The Expendables and Sly and Robbie and September 16, 2011
- k.d. lang – November 11, 2008, with Dustin O'Halloran
- Chris Botti – November 21, 2008
- The Blus Blast Music Festival – February 21, 2009
- Fall Out Boy – April 3, 2009, with Cobra Starship, All Time Low, Metro Station and Hey Monday
- Kings of Leon – May 19, 2009, with The Walkmen
- The Pedal to the Metal Music Festival – September 2, 2009
- Brand New – October 22, 2009, with The Manchester Orchestra and The Builders and the Butchers
- Boys Like Girls – October 28, 2009, with Cobra Starship, The Maine, A Rocket to the Moon and VersaEmerge
- Mastodon – November 17, 2009, with Converge and High on Fire
- Candye Kane – February 27, 2010, with The Insomniacs
- 30 Seconds to Mars – April 10, 2010, with The Neon Trees and The Street Drum Corps
- The Cool Music Festival – July 30, 2010
- Tommy Castro & The Painkillers – February 19, 2011, with Trampled Under Foot
- Authority Zero – April 1, 2011
- Volbeat – April 11, 2011, with The Damned Things and Hourcast
- The Black Keys – April 14, 2011, with Cage the Elephant and The Stone Foxes
- Lupe Fiasco – April 21, 2011
- Cake – June 10, 2011, with Calexico
- Wiz Khalifa – June 28, 2011
- Atmosphere – August 27, 2011, with Evidence and July 11, 2013, with Slightly Stoopid
- The Rock Allegiance Tour – September 23, 2011
- The Avett Brothers – October 21, 2011, October 5, 2013, with Nicholas David and February 7, 2015
- The World Warr III Music Festival – November 1, 2011
- Mac Miller – October 6, 2012, with Travis Porter
- The Bounce Music Festival – October 26, 2012
- Ed Sheeran – February 13, 2013
- Sixto Rodriguez – April 18, 2013, with Giant Squid
- That Damn Show Festival – April 20, 2013
- The Piano Guys – June 12, 2013
- Kendrick Lamar – June 26, 2013
- Matisyahu – August 8, 2013, with Rebelution
- A Day to Remember – September 28, 2014, with Bring Me the Horizon, Chiodos and Motionless in White
- Skrillex – October 9, 2014, with DJ Mustard, Branchez and David Heartbreak
- KDKB 93.3's Ugly Sweat Holiday Concert – December 15, 2014
- Karol G - October 30, 2021

== See also ==
- List of contemporary amphitheaters
