= List of best-selling albums of 2013 =

This is a list of the world's best-selling albums of 2013. According to IFPI, the best-selling album of 2013 was Midnight Memories, selling 4.0 million copies worldwide. Both physical and digital album sales are included.

== List of best-selling albums ==
Rank	Album	Artist	Sales (in millions)	Release date
1.	Midnight Memories	(United Kingdom) / (Republic of Ireland) One Direction	4.0	25 November, 2013
2.	The Marshall Mathers LP 2	(United States) Eminem	3.8	November 5, 2013
3.	The 20/20 Experience	(United States) Justin Timberlake	3.6	March 15, 2013
4.	Unorthodox Jukebox	(United States) Bruno Mars	3.2	December 7, 2012
5.	Random Access Memories	(France) Daft Punk	3.2	17 May, 2013
6.	Prism	(United States) Katy Perry	2.8	October 18, 2013
7.	To Be Loved	(Canada) Michael Bublé	2.4	April 22, 2013
8.	Night Visions	(United States) Imagine Dragons	2.4	September 4, 2012
9.	Artpop	(United States) Lady Gaga	2.3	November 6, 2013
10.	Beyoncé	(United States) Beyoncé	2.3	December 13, 2013

== See also ==
- List of best-selling albums of 2014
- List of best-selling albums
- List of best-selling singles
- List of best-selling albums by country
- Lists of albums
- List of best-selling albums of the 21st century
