= Hidden track =

Music not detectable by casual listeners

In the field of recorded music, a hidden track (sometimes called a ghost track, secret track or unlisted track) is a song or a piece of audio that has been placed on a CD, audio cassette, LP record, or other recorded medium, in such a way as to avoid detection by the casual listener. In some cases, the piece of music may simply have been left off the track listing, while in other cases, more elaborate methods are used. In rare cases, a "hidden track" is the result of an error that occurred during the mastering stage of the recorded media. Since the rise of digital and streaming services such as iTunes and Spotify in the late 2000s and early 2010s, the inclusion of hidden tracks has declined on studio albums.

It is occasionally unclear whether a piece of music is "hidden." For example, "Her Majesty," which is preceded by fourteen seconds of silence, was originally unlisted on The Beatles' Abbey Road but is listed on current versions of the album. That song and others push the definition of the term, causing a lack of consensus on what is considered a hidden track. Alternatively, such things are instead labeled as vague audio experiments, errors, or simply an integral part of an adjacent song on the record.

== Techniques ==
A vinyl record may be double-grooved, with the second groove containing the hidden tracks. Examples of double-grooving include Monty Python's "three-sided" Matching Tie and Handkerchief, Tool's Opiate EP, and Mr. Bungle's Disco Volante.

With the invention of digital media and compact discs, alternative methods for hiding unlisted tracks were conceived. With a similar aim of concealment, unlisted tracks are sometimes given their own separate index point on digital media. Songs can be placed in the pregap of the first track of certain CD formats, so that the CD must first be cued to the track, and then manually back-scanned. These are often referred to as Track 0 or Hidden Track One Audio (HTOA). A CD player will not play these tracks without manual intervention, and some models (including many computer operating systems) are unable to read such content. On Super Furry Animals' Guerrilla, "The Citizens Band" is found in the pre-gap approximately five minutes before the beginning of track one. A glossary of terms used in the song's lyrics is printed on the interior of the cardboard outer sleeve of the CD. This essentially renders them inaccessible without taking the sleeve apart, hiding the glossary in a parallel way to the song itself. The second iteration of Windows Media Player released in 2022 detects the hidden track as a part of the first track while playing a CD.

A less concealed method is to place the song at the end of another track, typically the last track on the album, following a period of silence. For example, Nirvana's song "Endless, Nameless" was included as a hidden track in this way on their 1991 CD Nevermind, after 10 minutes of silence within the track listed as the final song. Although it was not the first hidden song to use this technique, it gained significant attention. Similarly, a series of short tracks of silence can be placed before the hidden track. On Lazlo Bane's debut album, 11 Transistor, the eleventh song is followed by 57 silent tracks, each four seconds in duration, with "Prada Wallet" (sometimes referred to as "The Birthday Song") being the 69th track on the album. The total length of silence between the two songs is 3:48.

It is possible for a track to be playable only through a computer, such as the "15th" track on Marilyn Manson's Mechanical Animals album, which can only be accessed through an Enhanced CD executable.

There are deeper ways a track can be hidden. A "ghost" track can be subtly mixed to play concurrently with other, dominant audio, or heavily distorted in a way that must be undone to be played. For example, on a DVD included with the deluxe and "ultra-deluxe" editions of Nine Inch Nails' Ghosts I–IV, two hidden tracks ("37 Ghosts" and "38 Ghosts") are included as digital multitrack files, from which the songs may be reconstructed.

== Reasoning ==
- Aaliyah's self-titled album Aaliyah features the hidden song "Messed Up" on track 15. During the stages of the album creation, Aaliyah had no desire to put this song on the album, but after numerous inquiries from different labels and colleagues, she settled on making it a hidden track.
- In rare cases, it is used to avoid legal issues. An example is Ramones' Loco Live American version, which has the song "Carbona Not Glue" hidden after "Pet Sematary" on track 17. It was originally recorded on their album Leave Home, but the makers of the spot remover Carbona, a registered trademark, objected. Therefore, reference to the song was removed from the album and cover.
- "Freedom" by Paul McCartney was a hidden track on the original release of Driving Rain. It was later added as a track on the re-release. The track was not meant to be hidden; it was a tribute to 9/11 victims, and McCartney wanted it on the album. The artwork was already finalised, so there was no choice but to make it a hidden track.
- "Train in Vain" by The Clash, which appears at the end of London Calling, was left out of the vinyl's track listing simply because it was a last-minute addition to the album, when the sleeves were already printed. It is thus not a real hidden track. It was originally intended as a promotional giveaway for NME. The later CD versions list the track on the sleeve.
- "Weird Al" Yankovic's "Bite Me" from the album Off the Deep End was put on after ten minutes of silence to scare listeners who had forgotten to turn off the CD player. It was also a loose parody of "Endless, Nameless" by Nirvana. The cover of Off the Deep End is also a parody of the album containing that track, Nevermind, and its first track is a parody of that album's first track, "Smells Like Teen Spirit".
- The X-Files: The Album features a hidden track at 10 minutes and 13 seconds into the final track. The track consists of series creator Chris Carter explaining the series' mythology and meaning behind the alien conspiracy. The hidden track even includes spoilers and minute details about the show's overall plot that had not yet been resolved on the show itself when the album was released. This track was included as both a surprise to devoted fans who would seek out answers in cross-promotional merchandise and as a mystery to new fans who would need to watch the show more closely to better understand the track.
- Eugene Mirman's album The Absurd Night Club Comedy of Eugene Mirman includes a hidden track making fun of hidden tracks, and telling the listener that they have a very bizarre mission.
- The Jam's All Mod Cons does not list the song "English Rose" and its lyrics on original vinyl copies because Paul Weller believed the title and song would lose meaning without accompanying music. They have been added to re-releases of the album.
- Skip Spence's "Land of the Sun" was included as a hidden track by producer Bill Bentley to specifically close a tribute album to Spence, More Oar: A Tribute to the Skip Spence Album.
- Oasis' compilation album Time Flies features the single "Sunday Morning Call" as a hidden track. The album was an anthology of all of the band's singles, but principal songwriter Noel Gallagher openly detests the song, so they chose to have it hidden.

== Notable hidden tracks ==
Some hidden tracks are historically significant, have become well known, and even occasionally received radio airplay and climbed the charts.

- The Beatles' track "Her Majesty" from their 1969 album Abbey Road is considered a hidden track. It was originally a part of the medley on side two of the album, before Paul McCartney requested that it be removed; the engineer who edited it out of the rough mix placed it after the medley to preserve it, and when the Beatles heard it there, they decided to place it there on the album. The original pressings of Abbey Road did not list "Her Majesty" on the back cover song title listing, nor the record label; subsequent LP pressings and then CD issues were issued revealing the track. However, two years prior, in 1967, on the UK version of the Sgt. Pepper's Lonely Hearts Club Band album, there was the "inner groove" that appeared after "A Day in the Life" at the end of side two. It was an unexpected, untitled, and uncredited Beatles recording; so this might be deemed a precursor to the hidden track. A potential hidden track on yet another Beatles album is on The Beatles (also known popularly as The White Album) 1968 double album. The hidden track is a snippet of a song called "Can You Take Me Back", serving as an "outro" to "Cry Baby Cry".
- Nirvana put the hidden song "Endless, Nameless" 10 minutes after the last listed track on their 1991 album Nevermind. It was the first prominent hidden track in the CD era and inspired a slew of hidden tracks on albums in the following years. Lead singer Kurt Cobain said he got the idea from when he would make mix tapes for his friends and then add a secret song after a long silent gap at the end, to startle them. Some of the initial pressings of the album accidentally omitted the secret track because the person pressing the album thought it was not meant to be there. This was corrected in subsequent pressings.
- Cracker's "Euro-Trash Girl", an original, was one of their biggest radio hits, despite being a hidden track on Kerosene Hat.
- Castlevania: Symphony of the Night, released on the Sony PlayStation in 1997, features a hidden track known colloquially as "bonus". This song can only be heard by inserting the game disc into a CD player and ignoring a warning about nonexistent upcoming raw data, which was common when attempting to play CD-ROM based games on traditional players.
- Of the two hidden tracks on Lauryn Hill's The Miseducation of Lauryn Hill, one of them, the cover of "Can't Take My Eyes Off You" was nominated for a Grammy in 1999 in the category of 'Best Female Pop Vocal Performance'. It was the first time a hidden track was nominated for a Grammy.
- "Skin (Sarabeth)" by Rascal Flatts, a hidden track from their 2004 album Feels Like Today, received enough airplay to chart in the Top 40 on the country charts, peaking at number 2 in late 2005. In mid-2005, the album was reissued, with the song officially listed as a track, coinciding with the song's release as a single.
- Tally Hall's 2005 album Marvin's Marvelous Mechanical Museum had a hidden track, aptly titled "Hidden in the Sand", that would prove to be the band's most successful song, gaining over 35 million plays on YouTube and over 280 million on Spotify.
- Robbie Williams has had hidden tracks on many of his albums. On his first studio album, Life thru a Lens, the standard edition included one hidden track. His second album, I've Been Expecting You, includes two. By doing this, Williams' regular listeners would have likely expected a hidden track of sorts on the third album, Sing When You're Winning. To play on this, instead of a hidden track appearing on the album, a recording of Williams' saying "No, I'm not doing one on this album" plays after 24 minutes of silence.

== See also ==
- Easter egg (media)
- B-side
- List of albums with tracks hidden in the pregap
- List of backmasked messages
- Backmasking
- Bonus track
- Sampling (music)
- Surprise album
