= List of best-selling albums of 2014 =

This is a list of the world's best-selling albums of 2014. According to IFPI, the best-selling album of 2014 was Frozen (soundtrack), selling 10.0 million copies worldwide. Both physical and digital album sales are included.

== List of best-selling albums ==
Soundtrack

Rank	Album	Artist	Sales (in millions)	Release date
1.	Frozen	Various Artists	10.0	November 25, 2013
2.	2014 Forest Hills Drive	(United States) J.Cole	6.0	October 27, 2014
3.	x	(United Kingdom) Ed Sheeran	4.4	June 20, 2014
4.	Ghost Stories	(United Kingdom) Coldplay	3.7	May 19, 2014
5.	In the Lonely Hour	(United Kingdom) Sam Smith	3.5	May 26, 2014
6.	Four	(United Kingdom) / (Republic of Ireland) One Direction	3.2	November 17, 2014
7.	Rock or Bust	(Australia) AC/DC	2.7	November 28, 2014
8.	Guardians of the Galaxy	Various Artists	2.5	July 29, 2014
9.	The Endless River	(United Kingdom) Pink Floyd	2.5	November 7, 2014
10.	Pure Heroine	(New Zealand) Lorde	2.0	September 27, 2013

== See also ==
- List of best-selling albums of 2013
- List of best-selling albums
- List of best-selling singles
- List of best-selling albums by country
- Lists of albums
- List of best-selling albums of the 21st century
