= List of UK Albums Chart number ones =

This is a list of the number one hits in the UK Albums Chart, from its inception in 1956 to the present. The sources are the Record Mirror chart from 1956 to the end of 1958, the Melody Maker chart from November 1958 to March 1960, the Record Retailer chart from March 1960 to March 1972 and the Music Week chart from then onwards. In January 1989 the compilation album chart started, and compilation albums were excluded from the main chart.

- List of UK Albums Chart number ones of the 1950s
- List of UK Albums Chart number ones of the 1960s
- List of UK Albums Chart number ones of the 1970s
- List of UK Albums Chart number ones of the 1980s
- List of UK Albums Chart number ones of the 1990s
- List of UK Albums Chart number ones of the 2000s
- List of UK Albums Chart number ones of the 2010s
- List of UK Albums Chart number ones of the 2020s

The first number one album was Frank Sinatra's Songs for Swingin' Lovers!. For its first few years the chart was usually topped by a musical soundtrack or original cast recording, but rock albums steadily gained ground. Rock was dominant after the release of The Beatles first LP, Please Please Me, in 1963, except for the two-and-a-half-year spell later in the 1960s when the soundtrack of The Sound of Music went to the top of the charts repeatedly. As of the week ending 1 December 2013, Robbie Williams' tenth studio album Swings Both Ways became the 1,000th album to become number 1.

== Records ==
The original soundtrack of South Pacific holds the record for the most weeks at Number 1, with a cumulative total of 115 weeks, including one stretch of 70 consecutive weeks. A fairly distant second place is held by The Sound of Music soundtrack with a cumulative total of 70 weeks. Third is The King and I soundtrack with a cumulative total of 48 weeks. Fourth is the highest non soundtrack Bridge over Troubled Water by Simon and Garfunkel with a cumulative total of 33 weeks.

The second longest consecutive streak is held by The Beatles' Please Please Me, which spent 30 weeks at the top before being knocked off by the band's second album, With the Beatles, which was itself at the summit for 21 weeks. This means The Beatles were at number one for 51 consecutive weeks in all - a total not bettered by any other artist.

== See also ==
- Lists of albums
- List of artists by number of UK Albums Chart number ones
- List of UK Singles Chart number ones
- List of one-hit wonders on the UK Albums Chart
- Lists of UK Compilation Chart number ones
- Lists of UK Country Albums Chart number ones
- Lists of UK Dance Albums Chart number ones
- Lists of UK Independent Albums Chart number ones
- List of UK Albums Chart Christmas number ones
- Lists of UK Album Downloads Chart number ones
- Lists of UK Rock & Metal Albums Chart number ones
- Lists of UK R&B Albums Chart number ones
