= List of backmasked messages =

The following is a list of backmasked messages in music. The list includes notable recordings or notable artists, and is ordered by the group's name or the artist's last name.

Artist	Source	Message	Comments
Ash	"Evil Eye" (album)	"She's giving me the evil eye, suck Satan's cock."	Said at the beginning of the song. Lead singer Tim Wheeler remarked that "Yeah, we did hide a secret message in 'Evil Eye', but it's not that bad..."
At the Drive-In	"300 MHz" (EP)	"...your enamel / made no reflection in our mirror / coughing up the coffins / cotton candy coated teeth / these pockets were clinching all filled with teeth / amnesia proletariat / in the unlikely event / that sarcasm is an unfitting dress / amnesia proletariat / amnesia proletariat / amnesia / coughing up the coffins / cotton candy coated teeth / these pockets were clinching / all filled with teeth / sharpened on the fucking hides of men..."	Heard by reversing the song starting at the 94-second mark. The message is composed of rearranged verses from earlier in the song.
The B-52s	"Detour Thru Your Mind" (album)	"I buried my parakeet in the backyard. Oh, no, you're playing the record backward. Watch out—you might ruin your needle."	A reversed message in Fred Schneider's voice, starting at the 4:35 mark. Quoted in Patterson (2004): "The B-52s used the same approach at subliminal humor by placing a backward track on 'Detour Through Your Mind' from the LP Bouncing off the Satellites. When the track is reversed, the listener can hear Fred Schneider’s voice saying, 'I buried my parakeet in the backyard. Oh, no, you’re playing the record backward. Watch out—you might ruin your needle.'"
The Beatles	"Rain"	"...the sun shines. Raaain. If the rain comes, they run and hide their heads"	Gibberish occurs during the fade-out (accompanying music is not reversed), actually sections of the vocal melody. This was one of the earliest instances of backmasking. The deliberate reversal was repeatedly acknowledged by John Lennon and others.
The Beatles	"Free as a Bird" (album)	"Turned out nice again."	Can be heard during the song's fade-out. Was commented upon by many newspapers after the album's release in 1995 and the discovery of the message by BBC Radio 5 Live producer Simon Clifford. Paul McCartney said, "We even put one of those spoof backwards recordings on the end of the single for a laugh, to give all those Beatles nuts something to do."
Beck	"Loser" (album)	"Soy un perdedor. I'm a loser, baby, so why don't you kill me?" (entire chorus reversed)	After the last time Beck says "I'm a loser, baby, so why don't you kill me?" and before the vocal "I'm a driver. I'm a winner."
Boards of Canada	"1969" (album)	"David Koresh"	In the sentence "Although not a follower of David Koresh, she's a devoted Branch Davidian." The rest of the sentence is not backmasked.
Bloodhound Gang	"Lift Your Head Up High (And Blow Your Brains Out)" (album)	"Devil child, wake up and eat Chef Boyardee Beefaroni" (4x)	This message was included as a response to the accusations of backwards messages in songs.
The Brothers Johnson	"The Devil" (album)	"Your mother sucks cocks in hell! Give us your ass, ah, ah"	A quote from the demon Pazuzu in the film The Exorcist (1973).
Butthole Surfers	"Pepper" (album)	"I don't mind the sun sometimes, the images it shows. I can taste you on my lips and smell you in my clothes. Cinnamon and sugary and softly spoken lies. You never know just how you look through other people's eyes."	Between the second chorus and the third verse.
Cake	"Jesus Wrote a Blank Check" (album)	"Don't forget to breathe in."	This occurs after the song ends (about 3:06 of the track).
Choking Victim	"Hate Yer State" (album)	"You think you're alive, motherfucker? You're just the walking fucking dead, you're a fucking sheep, stepping on my back to stay alive. West Coast, East Coast, you're all just a bunch of fucking fools, you and the rest of this greedy fucking world. Kill yourself! So stay in school, say no to drugs, oh yeah! Hail Satan! Good night boys and girls, pleasant dreams."	At the beginning of the song.
Jay Chou	"You Can Hear" (album)	"Only you can hear it"	Following the same line forwards. This is done intentionally, so if you play it backwards, "only you can hear it".
Chumbawamba	"Mary, Mary" (album)	A woman recites the Hail Mary.	"Mary" recites the Hail Mary.
Coldplay	"❍ (Music of the Spheres II)" (album)	"Ladies and gentlemen, welcome to Music of the Spheres! Remember, everyone is an alien somewhere."	Each line is individually reversed and placed in reverse order as to say "Everyone is an alien somewhere / remember / Spheres / of the / Music / Welcome to / Ladies and gentlemen."
Cradle of Filth	"Dinner at Deviant's Palace" (EP)	Unusual sounds and a reversed reading of the Lord's Prayer.	Backwards readings of the Lord's Prayer are allegedly used in certain demonic rites.
Deep Purple	"Stormbringer" (album)	"Cocksucker, motherfucker, stormbringer!"	Occurs at the beginning of the song before the first verse.
Def Leppard	"Rocket" (album)	"We are fighting with the gods of war"	A preview of another song, "Gods of War", on the album Hysteria.
Def Leppard	"White Lightning" (album)	"She's got the rhythm of love"	From the song "Heaven Is", recorded backwards.
Deicide	"Satan Spawn, the Caco-Daemon" (album)	"Satan spawn, cacodaemon, cacodaemon, cacodaemon, satan spawn, cacodaemon, cacodaemon, cacodaemon."	At the beginning of the track, accompanied by bleating of sheep. Effectively the same as the chorus.
Dio	"Shame on the Night" (album)	"Crucify the diver"	Starting at the 4:57 minute mark. Only the first two words are reversed.
Drowning Pool	"Sermon" (album)	"Ladies and gentlemen, tell me what you believe"	A reversal of earlier parts of the song. Drummer Mike Luce said, "It's just a homage. A tribute back to the old school."
The Dukes of Stratosphear	"The Mole from the Ministry" (mini-album)	"Hey go fuck yourself with your atom bomb."	Sped up excerpt at the very end of the track, taken from a radio interview of The Fugs' Tuli Kupferberg.
Electric Light Orchestra	"Down Home Town" (album)	"Face the mighty waterfall" (2x)	At the beginning of the track. This album was released in 1975 following allegations of a hidden message in 1974's Eldorado, and was a satirical response.
Electric Light Orchestra	"Fire on High" (album)	"The music is reversible, but time... (violin note) is not. Turn back! Turn back! Turn back! Turn back!"	Reversal of a deep mumbling spoken by drummer Bev Bevan. Another response to the Eldorado controversy.
Electric Light Orchestra	Various songs from Secret Messages (Those are "Secret Messages", "Time After Time", "Stranger", "Danger Ahead", "Rock 'n' Roll Is King" and the intended side D track for a double album "Hello My Old Friend")	"Welcome to the show" (2x), "Thank you for listening," "Look out, there's danger ahead," "Listen to music," "Hup two three four," "Time after time," "You're playing me backwards," "Plant a tree," and "Backward(s) messages can be fun"	Contains many backwards and hidden messages, both visual and auditory. It was a further response to the Satanic backmasking controversy. The British release contains a parody warning label about the backward messages, but this was deleted by CBS Records for the United States version.
Missy Elliott	"Work It" (album)	"I put my thing down, flip it, and reverse it." and "Watch the way Missy like to take it backwards"	Reversed version of the preceding line. The "Watch the way Missy like to take it backwards" message can be heard in the middle of the second verse.
Eminem	"Stimulate" (album)	"I'm not here to save you / I'm only here for the ride / So let me entertain you / And everything will be fine."	At the end of the track.
Eurythmics	"This City Never Sleeps" (album)	"I enjoyed making that, er, record. Very good, very good"	At the end of the song, after some seconds of silence.
Filter	"The 4th" (album)	"Ooh what a hell of a price, what a hell of a price."	This part is most clear for the first 1:30 of the song.
Five Iron Frenzy	"Get Your Riot Gear" (EP)	"Brad is dead, let's kill Brad"	The backwards message references Nathanael "Brad" Dunham, who was missing at a concert. As people began to spread the rumor that he was dead, the band jokingly included this message in the song.
Franz Ferdinand	"Michael" (album)	"She's worried about you, call your mother."	Right before the second verse. A reference to bassist Bob Hardy's homesickness during the recording of the album. The band "wanted to do the exact opposite [of Satanic backmasking], put the most positive thing we could think of as a backwards message."
Robert Fripp	"Hååden Two" (album)	"One thing is for sure – the sheep is not a creature of the air. Baaaaaaaah!"	This line is a sample of Graham Chapman in a sketch from the first episode of Monty Python's Flying Circus.
Nelly Furtado	"Big Hoops (Bigger the Better)" (album)	"Oh my God! Descending to the 13th floor, 14, 16, we’re on the 11th floor, descending to the 12th floor. Oh my God! Descending to the 13th floor, 14, 16, we’re on the 11th floor, descending to the 12th floor"	Occurs at the very end of the song, after the breakdown. The message is more noticeable on the a cappella version of the song.
Grim Reaper	"Final Scream" (album)	"See you in hell!"	
Half Man Half Biscuit	"Christian Rock Concert" (album)	"The body of Shane Fenton is in the laundry chute of the New Ambassadors Hotel near Euston Station"	
Iced Earth	"Damien" (album)	"Your pain on the cross was but a splinter compared to the agony of my father. I will drive deeper the thorns into your rancid carcass, you profaner of vices. You have done nothing."	Reversed lyrics from earlier in the song.
Incubus	"Azwethinkweiz" (EP)	"Thursday night we smoked indica, and 'azwethinkweizm' was born"	At 3:40 in the song. The sentence is spoken by lead vocalist Brandon Boyd.
Information Society	"Are Friends Electric" (album)	"Obey your parents. Do your homework. Winners don't do drugs."	Heard between the songs "Are Friends Electric" and "Ozar Midrashim". The back of the album cover features the disclaimer "InSoc can accept no responsibility for the mental effect of the backwards message."
Insane Clown Posse	"Echo Side" (album)	"Fuck the Devil! Fuck that shit! We believe in life legit. If you diggin' what we say, why you throw your soul away?"	Heard after "licked the back of his neck and said..."
Insane Clown Posse	"Everybody Rize" (album)	"Yeah, if you flip this message cuz you think there's some secret message, there ain't shit!"	Reversal of gibberish at the end of the track. Said by Violent J.
Iron Maiden	"Still Life" (album)	"Hmm, hmmm, what ho sed de t'ing wid de t'ree bonce. Don't meddle wid t'ings you don't understand", followed by a belch.	Found between the songs "The Trooper" and "Still Life", on Piece of Mind. It is an inebriated Nicko McBrain (the drummer) doing his "famous" impression of Idi Amin. It translates to the following: "'What ho,' said the monster with the three heads, 'don't meddle with things you don't understand.'" The message was included by the band in response to allegations of Satanism that were surrounding them at the time.
The J. Geils Band	"No Anchovies, Please" (album)	"It doesn't take a genius to know the difference between chicken shit and chicken salad."	Reversed speech heard after the line "Upon awakening, she finds herself in a strange, foreign speaking nation."
Journey	"Message of Love" (album)	"Message of love"	The song title is backmasked in the opening 30 seconds of the song.
Judas Priest	"Love Bites" (album)	"In the dead of the night, love bites"	Admitted to by Rob Halford during the subliminal message trial. Halford said that "When you're composing songs, you're always looking for new ideas, new sounds."
Klaatu	"Silly Boys" (album)	The lyrics to "Anus Of Uranus" from a previous album.	Admitted in an interview with one of the band members. They took the lyrics from "Anus Of Uranus", reversed them, and one of the band members wrote out what the "new" lyrics sounded like.
KMFDM	"Sucks" (album)	"Hey, Satan, it's En Esch talking now; let me know what's going on, man. Call... call me anytime, man... I don’t know, it's your call."	Heard after the lyrics state that there's "a message from Satan if you turn it around"
Korn	"Shoots and Ladders" (album)	"This is madness"	Can be heard spoken repeatedly throughout the chorus.
L7	"Boys in Black" (album)	"All beef patties, special sauce, lettuce, cheese, pickles, onions on a sesame seed bun. Two all beef patties." (laugh)	The ingredients of a Big Mac.
Lacuna Coil	"Self Deception" (album)	"I don't know what to do, no guilt is in my heart, I don't know what to do, I'm not the reason"	The backwards message is the chorus of the song.
Linkin Park	"P5hng Me A*wy" (album)	"Everything falls apart even the people who never frown eventually break down. Everything has to end you'll soon find we're out of time left to watch it all unwind."	During the intro and breaks.
Linkin Park	"Announcement Service Public"	"You should brush your teeth, and you should wash your hands."	The only lyric to this interlude. Heard once at around 0:25 to 0:35, and four times from 1:45 to end.
Marilyn Manson	"Tourniquet" (album)	"This is my lowest point of vulnerability"	At the opening of the track.
Marilyn Manson	"Revelation #9"	Various messages. For example, "You are on the other side now... there ain't no going back once you been here, brothers and sisters... there ain't no going back."	Appears as the B-side for the single "Get Your Gunn".
The Mars Volta	"Eunuch Provocateur" (EP)	"Have mommy or daddy ever had to spank you?", "I'm very fond of this one about an old spider friend of mine", "The itsy bitsy spider climbed up the water spout / down came the rain and washed the spider out / out came the sun and dried up all the rain / and the itsy bitsy spider climbed up the spout again."	
Bob and Doug McKenzie	"Black Holes" (album)	"Good day, I'm Bob McKenzie. This is my brother, Doug." "Take off!" "No, how's it goin'?" "Oh, sorry, eh." "No, you take off!" "You take off!" "You blew it!" "Oh, sorry." "This is the backwards part." "Alright, start over." "Forget it!"	On their Great White North album, the comic duo explain on this track that there's a "secret message" to be played backwards that "will give you clues to what really happened." The message is preceded by an invitation to play the next part backwards "like you do with some other albums."
Mew	"New Terrain" (album)	The entire song played backwards reveals another song titled "Nervous".	Slightly audible.
Mindless Self Indulgence	"Backmask" (album)	"Respect your parents." / "Clean your room." / "Do your homework." / "Don't stay out too late." / "Eat your vegetables." / "Put away your toys." / "Don't sit too close to the TV." / "Take the dog for a nice walk." / "Hurry up! Get dressed for church." / "Who needs me to suck their dick?" / (at the end of the song) "Don't listen to this song."	Clearly audible reversed speech by singer Jimmy Urine; starts at 2:10 into the song and lasts until the end. The song speaks degradingly about angsty teenagers who look for backwards messages in music, and contains the lyrics "Play that record backwards / Here's a message yo for the suckas / Play that record backwards / And go fuck yourself."
Moby	"Machete" (album)	"I have to say goodbye."	Appears midway through the song.
Mogwai	"Yes! I Am A Long Way From Home" (album)	"What? Start speaking now? / When I shag a bird you'd think Antarctica had defrosted on her bed / Sometimes when I'm puffing hash I get a bird to suck my dong / Often when I don't clean my knob I get my sister to lick the cheese off my helmet / Everytime I put my arse off I smell shite all day / Once I was eating and I had to shoot my spunkhole so show us your head you slag! / I used to run about, you wee guys know that but I never touch him right?!"	Heard at the end of the song.
Motörhead	"Nightmare/The Dreamtime" (album)	"Now tell me, about your miserable little lives. I do not subscribe to your superstitious, narrow minded flights* of paranoia. I and people like me, will always prevail! You will never stifle* our free speech in any country in the world, 'coz we will fight forever*." "In a single stroke, you poor, stupid, running dogs. Why is it..." [Words followed by a * are difficult to make out, and may be incorrect]	Various sections of the song. Reputedly a message to the Parents Music Resource Center.
Mr. Bungle	"Egg" (album)	"Rotting from the inside / over-incubated by the heat of fear and love / the self's coagula[ted]"	These are the lyrics from the start of the track, although the backwards version is a different take.
Nevermore	"Sentient 6" (album)	"Seven, seven, seven. I am the bringer of the end, fear me, I am the beast that is technology."	Occurs at 4:43.
Oasis	"D'You Know What I Mean?" (album)	"All my people right here, right now... d'you know what I mean? Yeah, yeah..."	Heard throughout some parts of the song, including the third verse.
Oingo Boingo	"Cry of the Vatos" (album)	"Just once or twice is good for your soul / Praise God! Brothers and sisters! / Accept Jesus into your heart and you will saved! / You will receive everlasting life / Listen to me, I've sinned, I know / Praise Jesus and you will be saved, saved, saved / Praise God, you are healed, healed, healed."	Entire song.
Ozzy Osbourne	"Bloodbath in Paradise" (album)	"Your mother sells whelks in Hull"	
Petra	"Judas' Kiss" (album)	"What are you looking for the devil for, when you ought to be looking for the Lord?"	A response to the backmasking controversy.
A Perfect Circle	"Renholdër" (album)	"Danny Lohner, Danny Lohner"	Said in a high-pitched voice. The title, "Renholdër", is "Re: D. Lohner" backwards. Danny Lohner was an early member of A Perfect Circle.
Pilot	"You're Devotion"	"Oh, oh, oh / It's magic, you know / Never believe it's not so / Och aye! / Oh, oh, oh / It's magic..."	Appears during the song's fade-out. The backmasked message is the chorus of Pilot's earlier song, "Magic". Bassist David Paton remarked: "We always meant to have something else there and after the success of 'Magic' the idea just came up in the studio for all of us to sing the chorus of 'Magic' on the fade. I think you might even hear an 'Och aye!' in there as well."
Pink Floyd	"Empty Spaces" (album)	"Hello, Looker. Congratulations. You've just discovered the secret message. Please send your answer to Old Pink, care of the funny farm, Chalfont." (voice in background) "Roger! Carolyne is on the phone!" "Ok"	The start and end of this line are difficult to hear, and it is often shortened to simply "...congratulations. You've just discovered the secret message. Please send your answer to Old Pink, care of the funny farm, Chalfont." Many fans believe this line refers to former lead singer Syd Barrett, who suffered a breakdown years earlier. Another interpretation of this is that it foreshadows the progression of Pink (the main character on The Wall) towards insanity and the "funny farm".
Plasmatics	"Coup d'État" (album)	"Consensus Programming is dangerous to your health. The brainwashed do not know they are being brainwashed"	After the song "The Damned", at the end of the album.
Prince	"Darling Nikki" (album)	"Hello, how are you? I'm fine. 'Cause I know that the Lord is coming soon. Coming, coming soon", followed by thirty-seven "hah"s.	At the end of the track with the sound of rain and wind. The message appears to be in sharp contrast to the rest of the sexually laden song.
The Prodigy	"Full Throttle" (album)	"We're going in full throttle!"	
Roxette	"Keep Me Waiting" (album)	"Did you keep me waiting?"	Occurs at the start of the song.
The Rutles	"Piggy in the Middle" (album)	"This little piggy went to maaaarket."	Found prior to the bridge at around 1:13.
Slayer	"Hell Awaits" (album)	"Join us!" (x45) followed by "Welcome back" as a greeting to their fans for their 2nd record.	Whispered (steadily getting louder) during the first 1-minute and 5 seconds of the song.
Soundgarden	"665" (album)	"Santa, I love you baby. My Christmas king. Santa, you’re my king. I love you, Santa baby. Got what I need."	Throughout the song.
Randy Stonehill	"Rainbow" (album)	"He shall reign forever."	At around 1:30.
Tenacious D	"Karate" (album)	"Eat donkey crap."	This plays at the end of "Karate", before the song "Rock Your Socks" begins.
They Might Be Giants	"I'll Sink Manhattan"	"Thanks a lot boys. From the NYPD. We love you."	
They Might Be Giants	"Subliminal" (album)	"Stare into the subliminal for as long as you can (subliminal) / Stare into the subliminal for as long as you can (stare into the subliminal)"	The final lyrics recorded backwards, at the end of the song.
Tiger Army	"Towards Destiny" (album)	"Tiger Army never die, Tiger Army never die, Tiger Army never die. As the last tiger dies, the Ghost Tigers rise. Heed the call of the werecat Transylvania. We fight on the side of fate. Toward destiny, we ascend to it forever. Hail Satan."	After the first verse, at around 0:36.
Tool	"Intension" (album)	"Listen to your mother. Your father is right. Work hard. Stay in school. Listen to your mother. Your father is right. Listen to your mother. Your father is right."	Occurs during indecipherable whispering and ambiance beginning at 0:59.
Twenty One Pilots	"Nico and the Niners" (album)	"Renounce vialism. You will leave Dema and head true east. We are banditos." (0:06–0:16) "We are banditos" (3:32–3:35)	0:06–0:16, turned up one pitch that sounds like Josh Dun.
United Nations	"Subliminal Testing" (album)	"You never listened, won't you turn this back around."	
Steve Vai	"Whookam" (album)	An extended message, beginning with "There is a god; the universe is not without a creator, sustainer and protector. He is the ocean of bliss."	Entire track.
The Waitresses	"The Smartest Person I Know" (EP)	"Anyone who worries about subliminal messages on pop records is a fool. Everyone else have a nice day."	Can be heard in the middle of the song, between the third and fourth verses.
Roger Waters	"Perfect Sense, Part I" (album)	"Julia, (pause) however (pause – the second thunder in normal direction), in the light and visions of the issues of Stanley, (pause) we changed our mind. (pause) We have decided to include a backward message. (pause – the first thunder is in normal direction) Stanley, (pause) for you, (pause) and for all the other book (short pause) burners."	Waters deliberately recorded a backwards message critical of film director Stanley Kubrick, who had refused to let Waters sample breathing sounds from 2001: A Space Odyssey. The message is climaxed by a loud, unintelligible shriek.
The White Stripes	"Walking With a Ghost"	"Get out of my mind."	During the backwards solo.
Roy Wood	"Under Fire" (album)	"I'm under fire, fire and I'll never get out."	Heard at the end of the song.
Akira Yamaoka	"The Reverse Will"	"Now I lay me down to sleep" / "I pray the Lord my soul to keep" / "If I should die before I wake" / "I pray the Lord my soul to take"	
"Weird Al" Yankovic	"I Remember Larry" (album)	"Wow, you must have an awful lot of free time on your hands."	At about 3:09 to 3:19.
"Weird Al" Yankovic	"Nature Trail to Hell" (album)	"Satan eats Cheez Whiz."	At around 3:40.
Frank Zappa	"Hot Poop" (album)	"Better look around before you say you don't care, / Shut your fucking mouth about the length of my hair, / How would you survive / If you were alive, / Shitty little person?"	This was done by Zappa, along with The Mothers of Invention, in 1968. Appears on the original vinyl record. These lines were cut from a different track, "Mother People", and replaced with less offensive lyrics. But the original lyrics were recorded backwards into the end of "Hot Poop", though with the word "fucking" mostly cut out.
Frank Zappa	"Ya Hozna" (album)	Various messages, including "I am the heaven / I am the water / Ich bin deine Ritze / Ich bin deine Ritze und Schlitze", "You're a lonely little girl / But your Mommy & your Daddy don't care", "I'm like reach / I'm like squat / I'm like roll / Repeat / Like roll over / Like thrust / Okay, like pull / Like push / I'm like... / Okay, like... blow / I'm blow", "You're never too old", and "Ich bin hier / Und du bist mein Sofa"	The vocals on "Ya Hozna" song are all backwards, although the backing track and guitar are mostly forwards. The vocals are made up of distorted outtakes from "Valley Girl", "Lonely Little Girl", and "Sofa #2". The lyrics sheet reads, "backwards vocal — you figure it out". Zappa may have recorded the song as a response to the early 1980s backmasking controversy.

== See also ==
- Backmasking
- Hidden message
- List of albums containing a hidden track
- Subliminal message
