= List of best-selling hip-hop albums of the 2010s in the United States =

This is a list of the best-selling hip-hop albums in the United States in the year 2010 based on RIAA certification and Nielsen SoundScan sales tracking.

== Best-selling hip-hop albums by year ==
Year	Artist	Album	Label	Certified Units	Certification
2011	Drake	Take Care	Young Money / Cash Money / Republic Records	(8,000,000)	8× Platinum
2010	Eminem	Recovery	Shady / Aftermath / Interscope	(8,000,000)	8× Platinum
2010	Nicki Minaj	Pink Friday	Young Money / Cash Money / Republic Records	(3,000,000)	3× Platinum
2010	Kanye West	My Beautiful Dark Twisted Fantasy	Roc-A-Fella	(3,000,000)	3× Platinum
2010	B.o.B	B.o.B Presents: The Adventures of Bobby Ray	Atlantic Records	(2,000,000)	2× Platinum
2010	Drake	Thank Me Later	Universal Motown	(1,000,000)	Platinum
2010	Lil Wayne	I Am Not a Human Being	Universal Motown	(1,000,000)	Platinum
2010	Lil Wayne	Rebirth	Universal Motown	(1,000,000)	Platinum
2010	Kid Cudi	Man on the Moon II: The Legend of Mr. Rager	Universal Republic	(500,000)	Gold
2010	Ludacris	Battle of the Sexes	Disturbing tha Peace / Def Jam	(500,000)	Gold
2010	Rick Ross	Teflon Don	Maybach Music / Slip-n-Slide / Def Jam	(500,000)	Gold
2010	T.I.	No Mercy	Grand Hustle / Atlantic	(500,000)	Gold
