= List of albums with tracks hidden in the pregap =

This is a list of compact disc albums with tracks hidden in the pregap of the first track. The list includes either notable recordings or recordings that are by notable artists. The list is ordered by the group name or the artist's last name.

Artist	Album	Release year	Name of track (if known) or remarks	Ref.
2 Many DJs	As Heard on Radio Soulwax Pt. 2	2003	"Can't Get You Out of My Head" (Soulwax Elektronic Mix), a remix of the Kylie Minogue song	
311	Transistor	1997	"Transistor Intro" (instrumental)	
Adventures in Stereo	Monomania	2000		
The Adverts	Crossing the Red Sea with The Adverts	1997 (reissue)	Reissue of 1978 album includes four songs in the pregap: "Gary Gilmore's Eyes", "Bored Teenagers", "Safety In Numbers" and "We Who Wait"	
Anal Cunt	Morbid Florist	1993	Cover of The Doors' "Hello, I Love You", which was originally recorded for a tribute album	
Arcade Fire	Reflektor	2013	The first of the album's two CDs contains a ten-minute medley of instrumental outtakes from the 7 tracks of the CD, burned in reverse	
Ash	1977 (early pressings)	1996	Included "Jack Names the Planets" and "Don't Know" before track 1	
Autechre	EP7	1999	Untitled track included on the UK pressing by Warp Records: not included on the US pressing by Nothing Records	
Beastie Boys	Hello Nasty	1998		
B(if)tek	Frequencies Will Move Together	2003	One minute of dialogue from a children's story	
Black Rebel Motorcycle Club	Take Them On, On Your Own	2003	"Take Them On, On Your Own" included in the pregap on initial copies, then later included as a bonus track on the expanded edition released in 2008	
Bloc Party	Silent Alarm	2005	"Every Time Is the Last Time" is hidden in the pregap on the UK and US versions	
Blur	Think Tank	2003	"Me, White Noise", bringing the pregap's length to six minutes and fifty seconds	
Phoebe Bridgers	Lost Weekend	2026	"Best Dressed"	
Cheap Trick	Cheap Trick	1997	"Sound Collage"	
clipping.	Dead Channel Sky	2025	This track is typically referred to by fans as either "Indexing Error" (referencing the nature of its existence), or "Story 0" due to the various references to their previous songs in their "Story" series, in particular the first track in the series from their 2013 mixtape Midcity, which "Story 0" leads into.	
Course of Empire	Initiation	1994	"Running Man"	
Dead Weather	Sea of Cowards	2010	35-second instrumental track	
Diamond Rio	IV	1996	Various earlier hits mixed with sound effects	
Bob Dylan	The Bootleg Series Vol. 4: Bob Dylan Live 1966,	1998	Includes the audiences jeers of the “Royal Albert Hall” Concert	
Electric Light Orchestra	Face the Music	1993 (reissue)	MasterSound gold disc reissue of 1975 album contains 34-second reversed clip from "Fire on High"	
Béla Fleck and the Flecktones	Little Worlds	2003	New York Yankees outfielder Bernie Williams and David St. Hubbins of Spinal Tap, stuck in traffic and flipping through radio stations. They hear songs from the album played in different styles and on different instruments.	
Fall Out Boy	Folie à Deux	2008	"Lullabye"	
Grateful Dead & John Oswald	Grayfolded	1995	The second CD, Mirror Ashes, has a 2-minute-and-10-second pregap entitled "Foldback", which plays the original recording of a 1969 feedback performance by the Dead frontwards as the track is being rewound, and backwards as it recoils in play mode.	
David Gray	White Ladder	2000	"Through To Myself"	
Luke Haines	Das Capital	2003	"Overture"	
Hilltop Hoods	The Calling	2003	"Stay the Fuck Away Because I Spit When I'm Talking"	
I Monster	Neveroddoreven	2003	"Dinner Jazz" (original); "Cells" (2000s revision)	
Lemon Jelly	'64–'95	2005	"Yes!"	
Less Than Jake	Losing Streak	1996	On the first track, Howie J. Reynolds introduces himself. In the pregap it is revealed that this is the last sentence of a story told by him.	
Kylie Minogue	Light Years	2000	"Password"	
Willie Nelson	Moonlight Becomes You	1994	a track explaining why he changed record labels	
Nick Cave and Dirty Three	Songs in the Key of X: Music from and Inspired by the X-Files	1996	"Time Jesum Transeuntum Et Non Riverentum"/"X-Files Theme"	
Opeth	Ghost Reveries	2005	"Reverie"	
Pansy Division	Absurd Pop Song Romance	1998	"Melba Vs. Gay Day"	
Pulp	This Is Hardcore	1998	Cymbal	
The Protomen	Act III: This City Made Us	2026		
Queens of the Stone Age	Songs for the Deaf	2002	"The Real Song for the Deaf"	
Rammstein	Reise, Reise	2004	Final 30 seconds of the flight recorder audio from Japan Air Lines Flight 123	
Robyn	My Truth	1999	"Det gör ont ibland" (featuring Petter)	
Carina Round	Slow Motion Addict	2007	"Same Girlfriend"	
Squarepusher	Kammerkonzert	2026	"K15 Avenue", a short solo electric bass composition. Located after the runout groove on vinyl versions.	
Super Furry Animals	Songs in the Key of X: Music from and Inspired by the X-Files	1996	"Time Jesum Transeuntum Et Non Riverentum"/"X-Files Theme"	
Super Furry Animals	Guerrilla	1999	"Citizen's Band"	
Super Furry Animals	Out Spaced	1998	"Spaced Out"	
Tally Hall	Marvin's Marvelous Mechanical Museum	2005	"Good Day (Simlish)", a Simlish version of the first track used in the Apartment Life DLC for The Sims 2. This is only on the Needlejuice release.	
They Might Be Giants	Factory Showroom	1996	"Token Back to Brooklyn", later rereleased as the 5th track of their subsequent album Long Tall Weekend	
UNKLE	Psyence Fiction	1998	"Intro (Optional)" on UK and Japanese pressings	
Vision Eternel	For Farewell of Nostalgia	2020	"Moments of Extended" on the Abridged Pause Recordings CD, and "Moments of Intimacy (Reprise)" on the Somewherecold Records CD	
The Wannadies	Bagsy Me	1997	Demo versions of "Silent People" and "Bumble Bee Boy" (one track in the left channel and the other in the right)	

== See also ==
- Lists of albums
- List of albums containing a hidden track
