= Destiny's Gate =

Studio album by Tish Hinojosa
- Released: 1994
- Label: Warner Bros.
- Producer: Tish Hinojosa, Jim Ed Norman

Tish Hinojosa chronology
Culture Swing (1992)	Destiny's Gate (1994)	Frontejas (1995)

Destiny's Gate is an album by the American musician Tish Hinojosa, released in 1994. Hinojosa intended the album to incorporate "polished" country and pop, while retaining her Rounder Records contract for music that was in the traditional Tex-Mex border style.

The album peaked at No. 38 on Billboard's Heatseekers Albums chart. Its first single was the rockabilly-tinged "I'm Not Through Loving You Yet"; Joe Ely appeared in the video. Hinojosa promoted the album with her "Border Tour", which included Santiago Jiménez Jr., Butch Hancock, and Don Walser.

== Production ==
The album was produced by Hinojosa and Jim Ed Norman. Hinojosa, who wrote all of the songs, sang in Spanish and English. Hinojosa was inspired by Linda Ronstadt, and thanked her in the album liner notes. Béla Fleck played banjo on Destiny's Gate. The title song is reprised in Spanish, as an unlisted track.

== Critical reception ==
Professional ratings
Review scores
Source	Rating
AllMusic	3/5 stars
Calgary Herald	B+
Chicago Tribune	3/4 stars
The Encyclopedia of Popular Music	3/5 stars
The Indianapolis Star	3/4 stars
MusicHound World: The Essential Album Guide	5/5 stars

The Washington Post praised Hinojosa's "rare gift for melody, which gives every song on this new collection a captivating lilt that's perfect for Hinojosa's lovely, relaxed soprano." The Chicago Reader stated that she "shifts seamlessly from folky stuff to jumping honky-tonk romps to cumbias ... and the album frames it all with a gloss that unfortunately renders some of her more delicate ballads a bit syrupy."

Rolling Stone noted that "Hinojosa brings as much conviction to the honky-tonk of 'I'm Not Through Loving You Yet' as she does to her bilingual border balladry." The Calgary Herald concluded that, "though only a few cuts are in Spanish, this first-generation American's sweet, unaffected voice shines best on the cuts in that lyrical language." The Chicago Tribune determined that "whispers of Patsy Cline whisk through 'I'm Not Through Loving You Yet'."

AllMusic wrote: "With a beautiful voice reminiscent of Joan Baez and Emmylou Harris, she seems to have perfected her unique blend of Mexican folk and country music."

== Track listing ==
No.	Title	Length
1.	"Destiny's Gate"
2.	"Saying You Will"
3.	"What More Can I Say in a Song"
4.	"Espérate (Wait for Me)"
5.	"Looking for My Love in the Pouring Rain"
6.	"I'm Not Through Loving You Yet"
7.	"Love of Mine"
8.	"I Want to See You Again"
9.	"Noche Sin Estrellas (Night Without Stars)"
10.	"Yesterday's Paper"
11.	"Baby Believe"
