= Tish Hinojosa =

American singer-songwriter (born 1955)

- Born: Leticia Hinojosa; December 6, 1955 (age 70); San Antonio, Texas, US
- Genres: Country, Folk
- Occupation: Singer-songwriter
- Instruments: Vocals, guitar
- Years active: 1969-present
- Labels: Warner Bros. Records, MCA/Curb, A&M, Rounder, Valley Entertainment, Watermelon Records, Texas Music Group, Tish Records (self released)
- Website: MundoTish

Leticia Hinojosa (born December 6, 1955, San Antonio, Texas) is a singer-songwriter, recording in both Spanish and English.

== Early life and career ==
Hinojosa is the youngest of 13 children. Hinojosa's parents were Mexican immigrants. Known for singing both traditional Mexican folksongs and her own original songs, both in Spanish and English, Hinojosa accompanies herself on guitar, which she plays right-handed although she is naturally lefthanded. Influenced by traditional Mexican, folk, Tejano, conjunto, and country types of music, Hinojosa considers her music to be music of the US/Mexico border.

Hinojosa has recorded numerous albums and has charted twice on the Billboard country charts. Her 1992 album Culture Swing won the National Association of Independent Record Distributors (NAIRD) Indie Folk Album of the Year.

Using music to bring awareness to cultural issues, Hinojosa hopes to bring into focus the plight of migrant workers and children of the poor. She often performs children's music of her culture to help children develop an understanding of the Southwest's Hispanic traditions.

In 2002, Hinojosa was arrested at the Laredo border crossing after 30 tablets of Rohypnol were found in the possession of her traveling companion; Hinojosa told authorities she had purchased the pills in Mexico believing them to be Ecstasy. In 2003, she was convicted of smuggling the date rape drugs into the United States and received three years of probation. That same month, Hinojosa was also charged with drunken driving and failure to stop and render aid after a hit-and-run accident in Austin.

As of 2021, Hinojosa lives in both Austin, Texas and Tubac, Arizona. In the 1970s and 1980s she also lived in Taos, New Mexico and Nashville, Tennessee. In 2005, Hinojosa moved to Germany, and in 2013 returned to Austin.

In December 2024, Hinojosa released a new work, demonstrating the ongoing impact of her muse on her art.

== Awards and honors ==
- White House performance for President Bill and Hillary Clinton
- NAIRD Indie Folk Album of the Year Culture Swing
- Las Primera (The Firsts) award from MANA, the largest organization of Latino women
- Performances at presidential and gubernatorial inauguration events.
- 1990 Platinum Album "Homeland" S. Korea
- 2019 Inducted into Texas Institute Of Letters

== Humanitarian activities ==
- Spokesperson, National Latino Children's Agenda
- Spokesperson, National Assoc. Of Bilingual Education
- United Farm Workers of America

== Discography ==
=== Albums ===
==== Self ====
- 1987 Taos to Tennessee, Self-release; re-released 1992;
- 1989 Homeland, Fonatana A&M Records, re-released 2006? w/ bonus track
- 1990, 1991 Memorabilia Navideña, EP: self released cassette; Watermelon Records re-released CD 1992
- 1991 Aquella Noche, Watermelon Records
- 1992 Culture Swing, Rounder Records
- 1994 Destiny's Gate, Warner Bros. Records
- 1995 Frontejas, Rounder Records
- 1996 Cada Niño/Every Child, Rounder Records
- 1996 Dreaming From The Labyrinth/Soñar del Laberinto, Warner Bros. Records
- 1996 Soñar del Laberinto, Warner Bros. Records
- 1997 The Best of the Sandia: Watermelon 1991–1992, Rounder Records compilation
- 1998 ...a Music and Information Digest, Warner Bros. Records promotion-only CD
- 2000 Sign of Truth, Rounder Records, Rounder Records
- 2003 Best of Tish Hinojosa – Live, Rounder Records
- 2003 From Texas for a Christmas Night re-release of 1990-1991 Memorabilia Navideña, with five additional newly-recorded songs; Lone Star Records/Texas Music Group
- 2005 A Heart Wide Open, Valley Entertainment
- 2006 Retrospective, Varèse Sarabande
- 2008 Our Little Planet, CRS (Varèse Sarabande)
- 2013 After the Fair, Varèse Sarabande
- 2018 West, Tish Records
- 2019 My Homeland, Tish Records
- 2024 With A Guitar & A Pen, Tish Records
- 2026 Live in Holland 1993 - Part 1, Strictly Country Records
- 2026 Live in Holland 1993 - Part 2, Strictly Country Records

==== The Texicana Mamas ====
- 2020 The Texicana Mamas, self-released, internet only

=== Singles ===
Year	Single	US Country	Album
1986	"I'll Pull You Through" (with Craig Dillingham)	80	single only
1989	"Til U Love Me Again"	75	Homeland
1992	"In the Real West"	—	Culture Swing
1993	"Closer Still"	—	Culture Swing
1993	"Drifter's Wind"	—	Culture Swing
1994	"I'm Not Through Loving You Yet"	—	Destiny's Gate

=== Music videos ===
Year	Video	Director
1992	"In the Real West"	
1993	"Drifter's Wind"	
1994	"I'm Not Through Loving You Yet"	Roger Pistole

- 2005 - "Kitchen Table"
- 2005 - "Derechos De El Corazon"

=== Bibliography ===
- Hinojosa, Tish, and Lucia Angela Perez. 2002. Cada Niño = Every Child : A Bilingual Songbook for Kids. El Paso, Tex. : Cinco Puntos Press, 2002.

== See also ==
- Music of Austin

== Further reading and listening ==
- Ragland, Cathy, "South Texas culture: Austin's Tish Hinojosa has made the jump to a major label", Folk Roots; Nov. 1994, pp. 42–43
- Dexter, Kerry, "A Home in Music." Dirty Linen: Folk & World Music, no. 141 (May 2009): 24–27.
- Hansen, Liane. "Interview: Tish Hinojosa, Singer-Songwriter, Discusses Her Life, Music and New CD". 2000. National Public Radio.
- Rodemann, Katharyn. 2005. "Tish Hinojosa." Texas Monthly 33 (12): 124–26.
