= Count off =

Cue to begin music

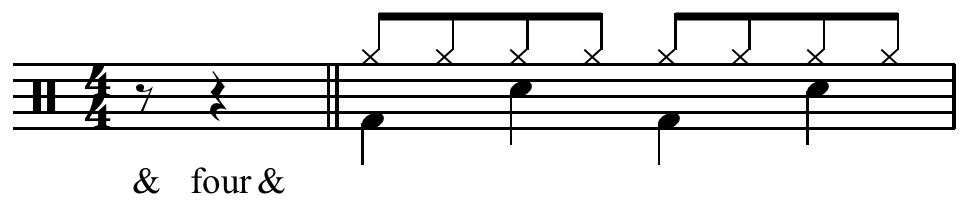
Second shortest count off, "& four &", followed by one measure of drum beat for reference.

A count off, count in, or lead-in is a verbal, instrumental or visual cue used in musical performances and recordings to ensure a uniform entrance to the performance by the musicians and to establish the piece's initial tempo, time signature and style. Although a count off usually lasts just one or two bars, it is able to convey the music's style, tempo, and dynamics from the leader (such as the conductor, bandleader or principal) to the other performers. A count off is generally in the same style of the piece of music—for instance, a joyful swing tune should have an energized count off. A misleading lead-in, one which indicates a different meter than that of the piece, is a false trail. Counting off is evident in musical genres other than Western classical and popular music; Ghanaian ethnomusicologist J. H. Kwabena Nketia has observed the benefits of such techniques in West African music.

A two-bar percussive and verbal count off played on a closed hi-hat

A silent count off, such as those given by an orchestral conductor using a baton, may be given as a value "in front" (e.g. "eight in front" refers to a count off of eight beats).

In recorded music, the final two beats of the count off (one, two, one—two—three—four) are often silent to avoid spill onto the recording, especially if the piece has a pickup. The count off is typically edited out after the recording has finished. There are, however, instances where the count off is deliberately kept on a recording—sometimes even edited onto a recording. In the case of "I Saw Her Standing There" by the Beatles, the count off was edited onto a different take of the song. A recorded count off can be made by musicians through an open microphone or through the studio's talkback system, the latter being done by non-performing personnel such as the producer or engineer. The inclusion of a count off in a studio recording may give the impression of a live performance, as on the Beatles' "Sgt. Pepper's Lonely Hearts Club Band Reprise" (1967).

Pre-count and count-off are functions of digital audio workstations which give an amount of click track—typically two bars—before the recording begins.

== Examples ==
- "Let's Dance" by Chris Montez (1962)
  - The song's verses accent upbeats on beats 1 and 3 and vice versa for the rest of the song, so drummer Jesse Sailes counts it off as "one—two—one, two, three".
- "I Saw Her Standing There" by the Beatles (1963)
  - Paul McCartney's count off of "one—two—three—four!" was recorded on the ninth take of the song, and then edited on to a different take comprising the rest of the song; George Martin liked the "spirited" raw live feel of the count off and decided to have it spliced onto a better performance.
- "Wooly Bully" by Sam the Sham and the Pharaohs (1965)
  - The song features a bilingual count off of "uno, dos, one, two, tres, cuatro".
- "Taxman" by the Beatles (1966)
  - George Harrison performs two count offs on the track—one is to set the tempo (and is most audible on the fourth beat), and another is for effect (it is off-tempo, "secretive-sounding", and layered with coughing) which was added later.
- "A Day in the Life" by the Beatles (1966)
  - John Lennon used a droll count off of "sugarplum fairy, sugarplum fairy"; the count off was not part of the take included on the album version (on Sgt. Pepper's Lonely Hearts Club Band) but was first released on Anthology 2 in 1996.
- "Give Peace a Chance" by John Lennon and the Plastic Ono Band (1969)
  - The version recorded for the Live Peace in Toronto 1969 album features Lennon beginning with a count off in German: "eins, zwei, ein—zwei—drei—vier".
- "Get Up (I Feel Like Being a) Sex Machine" by James Brown (1970)
  - The song begins with a few seconds of spoken dialogue, which Brown ends by saying "can I count it off? One—two—three—four!"
- "I Don't Wanna Face It" by John Lennon (1984)
  - The third track from Lennon's posthumous Milk and Honey album features a "characteristically free-form" count off of "un, deux, eins—zwei—hickle—pickle".
- "Patience" by Guns N' Roses (1988)
  - The song begins as bass guitarist Duff McKagen gives out the count off. "One, two, one, two, three, four".
- "You Get What You Give" by the New Radicals (1998)
  - Gregg Alexander counts the song off with "one, two, one–two–three–OW!"
- "Walla Walla" by The Offspring (1998)
  - The track starts with the count off "One and two and three and four and" which repeats as it approaches the tempo of the song.
- "Lonely Swedish (The Bum Bum Song)" by Tom Green (1999)
  - The count off happens mid-song after the bridge and before the final chorus. "One, two, three, four".
- "Son Song" by Soulfly featuring Sean Lennon (2000)
  - The song begins with a count off by Lennon. "One, two, three, four".
- "You'll Never Meet God (If You Break My Heart)" by Carly Hennessy (2001)
  - Co-written by the New Radicals' Gregg Alexander, the song echoes his introduction to 1998's "You Get What You Give" with a count off of "one, two, one–two–three–OW!"
- "Vertigo" by U2 (2004)
  - During the final two bars of a four-bar drum introduction Bono counts off the song with "unos, dos, tres, catorce" – Spanish for "some, two, three, fourteen".
- "Hot to Go!" by Chappell Roan (2023)
  - Starts on "five, six, five, six, seven, eight" mimicking a cheerleading chant.

== See also ==
- Upbeat
