= Stanford Prison Experiment (band) =

American punk band

- Origin: Los Angeles, California, USA
- Genres: Hardcore punk; punk rock; post-hardcore
- Years active: 1990–2002; 2023–present
- Labels: Island, World Domination
- Past members: Mario Jimenez; Davey Latter; Mike Starkey; Mark Fraser; Rob Cummings; George Kennedy
- Website: www.myspace.com/stanfordprisonexperiment

Stanford Prison Experiment was an American alternative rock based in Los Angeles, California, whose name was a reference to the Stanford prison experiment conducted by psychologist Philip Zimbardo in 1971. They released three albums in the 1990s, one of which appeared on the major label Island Records.

== Members ==
- Mario Jimenez – vocals (1990–2002)
- Mike Starkey – guitars (1990–2002)
- Davey Latter – drums (1990–2002)
- George Kennedy – bass (1990–1992)
- Rob Cummings – bass (1992–1993)
- Mark Fraser – bass (1993–2002)

== Discography ==
Albums

- Stanford Prison Experiment (1993, World Domination)
- The Gato Hunch (1995, World Domination)
- Wrecreation (1998, Island)

Compilation

- 1999 Sessions (1999, Independent)

EPs

- Rubbernose (1990, Chrome Gods)
- Stanford Prison Experiment (1991, Chrome Gods)

Singles

- "Take It" (1993, Chrome Gods)
- "Super Monkey" (1994, World Domination)
- "Disbelief" (1994, World Domination)
- "Mr. Teacher Dad" (1994, World Domination)
- "Cansado" (1995, World Domination)
- "You're the Vulgarian" (1996, World Domination)
- "Compete" (1998, Island)
