= Bustin =

Bustin is a surname. Notable people with the surname include:

- Beverly Bustin (born 1936), American politician from Maine
- Debra Bustin (born 1957), artist from New Zealand
- G. T. Bustin (1903–1995), American preacher, pastor, evangelist and missionary
- Pamela Bustin (born 1967), former field hockey defender from the United States
- Stephen Bustin (born 1954), British scientist, professor of molecular sciences at Queen Mary University of London 2004–2012

== See also ==
- Bust (disambiguation)
- Busti (disambiguation)
- Busting
- Bustino
- Bustin (song), by Neil Cicierega from the 2017 album Mouth Moods.
