= Burstein =

Burstein is a surname. Notable people with the surname include:

- Albert Burstein (born 1922), American Democratic Party politician in the New Jersey General Assembly
- Danny Burstein (born 1964), American actor of stage and screen who made his Broadway debut in 1992
- Elias Burstein (born 1917), American experimental condensed matter physicist
- Gabriel Burstein (born 1975), Argentine football manager and former player
- Joyce Burstein (born 1966), American installation artist
- John Burstein, creator and performer of the fictional character Slim Goodbody, the "Superhero of Health"
- Karen Burstein (born 1942), politician and former judge from New York
- Keith Burstein (born 1957), English composer, conductor and music theorist with Russian family origins
- Mark Burstein, U.S. academic administrator, 16th president of Lawrence University
- Michael A. Burstein (born 1970), American writer of science fiction
- Nanette Burstein (born 1970), American film and television director
- Pesach Burstein (1896–1986), Polish-born American comedian, singer, coupletist, and director of Yiddish vaudeville/theater
- Pinchas Burstein (1927–1977), Polish-born Jewish expressionist painter later known as Maryan S. Maryan
- Sylvain Burstein (1932–unknown), French chess master
- Tal Burstein (born 1980), retired Israeli professional basketball player

== See also ==
- Burstein–Moss effect, whereby the apparent band gap of a semiconductor is increased as the absorption edge is pushed to higher energies as a result of all states close to the conduction band being populated
- Burgistein
- Burgstein
- Bustin
- Stein (disambiguation)
