= Umbertide =

- Comune
- Comune di Umbertide
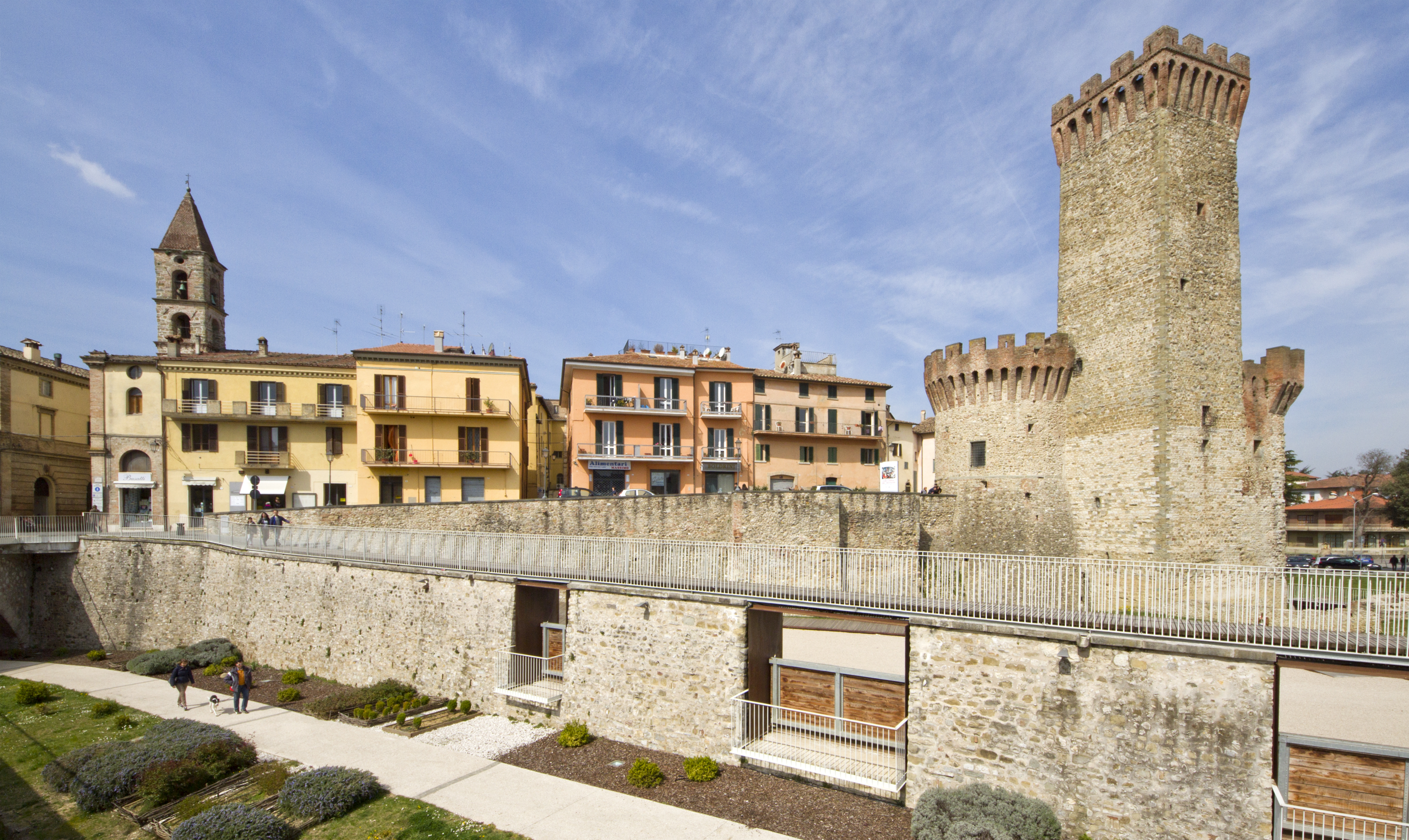
- View of Umbertide

- Coat of arms

- Location within Italy Location within Umbria
- Coordinates: 43.306594°N 12.326957°E
- Country: Italy
- Region: Umbria
- Province: Perugia (PG)

Government
  - Mayor: Luca Carizia (Right wing)

Area
  - Total: 200 km^{2} (77 sq mi)
- Elevation: 247 m (810 ft)

Population (1 January 2025)
  - Total: 16,232
  - Density: 81/km^{2} (210/sq mi)
- Demonym: Umbertidesi
- Time zone: UTC+1 (CET)
  - Summer (DST): UTC+2 (CEST)
- Postal code: 06019
- Dialing code: 075
- Patron saint: Madonna della Reggia
- Saint day: 8 September
- Website: Official website

Umbertide (Italian pronunciation: [umˈbɛrtide]; known as Fratta until 1863) is a town and comune (municipality) in the province of Perugia, in the Italian region of Umbria, at the confluence of the Reggia river and the Tiber.

With over 16,000 inhabitants in 2021, Umbertide is one of the larger towns of Umbria. As it is located in the river plain, it is basically flat. It is an industrial center producing machine tools, textiles, packaging material, and ceramics. Olive oil is also produced, especially in Pierantonio and in its southwestern part.

== Etymology ==
The town was formerly known as Fratta. Some 19th century writers attributed the origins of Fratta to the ancient city of Pitulum, said to have stood on the same site and to have been destroyed by the Goths. According to this tradition, the name Fratta derives from the Latin fracta ("broken" or "destroyed"), in reference to that earlier settlement.

The present name Umbertide was adopted in the 19th century and is derived from the sons of Uberto Ranieri, credited with rebuilding the settlement in the Middle Ages.

== History ==
=== Antiquity and Middle Ages ===
Umbertide and its surrounding area were inhabited in pre-Roman and Roman times. Evidence of earlier settlement includes an Umbrian fortification (a castelliere) discovered on the summit of Monte Acuto.

19th century writers averred that Fratta originated in the 2nd century BC, founded by survivors of the Roman army defeated at the Battle of Lake Trasimene. Archaeological finds of weapons, marbles and bronzes were taken to indicate the presence of an ancient town. According to this tradition, the settlement was destroyed during the barbarian invasions and was rebuilt in the 10th century by Uberto Ranieri, lord of Civitella (later Civitella Ranieri).

Fratta is first mentioned in 1189 under the name Fracta Filiorum Uberti. In that year it submitted to Perugia under Ugolino di Uguccione, having previously been held by the successors of Arimberto.

During the 14th century it functioned as an administrative center within the territory of Perugia. In 1396 an institutional reform established a shared castellan and podestà with Sigillo and Montone.

In 1351 Fratta was devastated during conflicts between the Visconti and Perugia by the army of Giovanni di Cantuccio Gabrielli of Gubbio. In 1393 Braccio Fortebracci was imprisoned in this fortress and later freed. In 1408 he defeated near Fratta the army of Ladislaus of Naples, and in 1413 he entered the town, subjecting it to destruction.

Fratta later passed under the control of the Church, but after the death of Pope Martin V it was again subjected to Perugia. The town was again devastated in 1478, amid plague, by troops of Federico, duke of Urbino. In 1479 it was attacked by Florentine forces, and in 1500 it was occupied by Cesare Borgia.

Throughout the factional conflicts that affected Perugia between the late 14th and early 16th centuries, Fratta often served as a refuge for exiles. It was repeatedly occupied and retaken, notably in 1385, when it was seized by exiles led by Tommaso di Ciardolino, and recovered the following year by forces under Albertino di Nino di Guidalotto and Mattiolo di Angeluccio di Colle. After its recovery, the defensive structures were strengthened and a substantial fortress was constructed. Further occupations occurred in 1394, 1431, and 1495.

=== Early Modern era ===
A municipal statute issued in 1521 regulated local government and institutions. The administration included a main council of forty members and a minor council of twelve, while artisan guilds played a central role in social and economic life.

In the 16th century the town remained loyal to Papal authority, including during the Salt War of 1540 and under the rule of Rodolfo Baglioni in 1534. After 1540, however, many local offices were suppressed as part of a tightening of central control, leaving only the principal governing bodies in place. In 1550 Fratta briefly passed under the control of the Vitelli family of Città di Castello, to whom it had been granted by Pope Julius III, before being restored to Perugia shortly thereafter.

In 1643–1644 Fratta withstood a siege during the War of Castro.

=== Contemporary period ===
The late 18th century brought political upheaval. In 1798, after the French invasion, Fratta became a municipality within the Department of Trasimeno within the Roman Republic. During this upheaval, the municipal archives were destroyed. After the fall of the republic in 1799, papal rule was restored. Further damage occurred in 1800 during the passage of Austro-Aretine troops.

Under Napoleonic rule, from 1809, Fratta became the center of a canton with its own administrative and judicial institutions. Following the second restoration of papal authority in 1814, earlier administrative structures were reinstated, though the status of Fratta fluctuated in subsequent years, being alternately a simple municipality and a seat of district government.

On 12 September 1860 Piedmontese troops under Manfredo Fanti entered the town, leading to the establishment of a provisional government. A plebiscite held the same year sanctioned annexation to the Kingdom of Sardinia.

Between 1862 and 1863 the town's name was formally changed from Fratta to Umbertide. In 1895, Umbertide had a population of 11,537.

== Geography ==
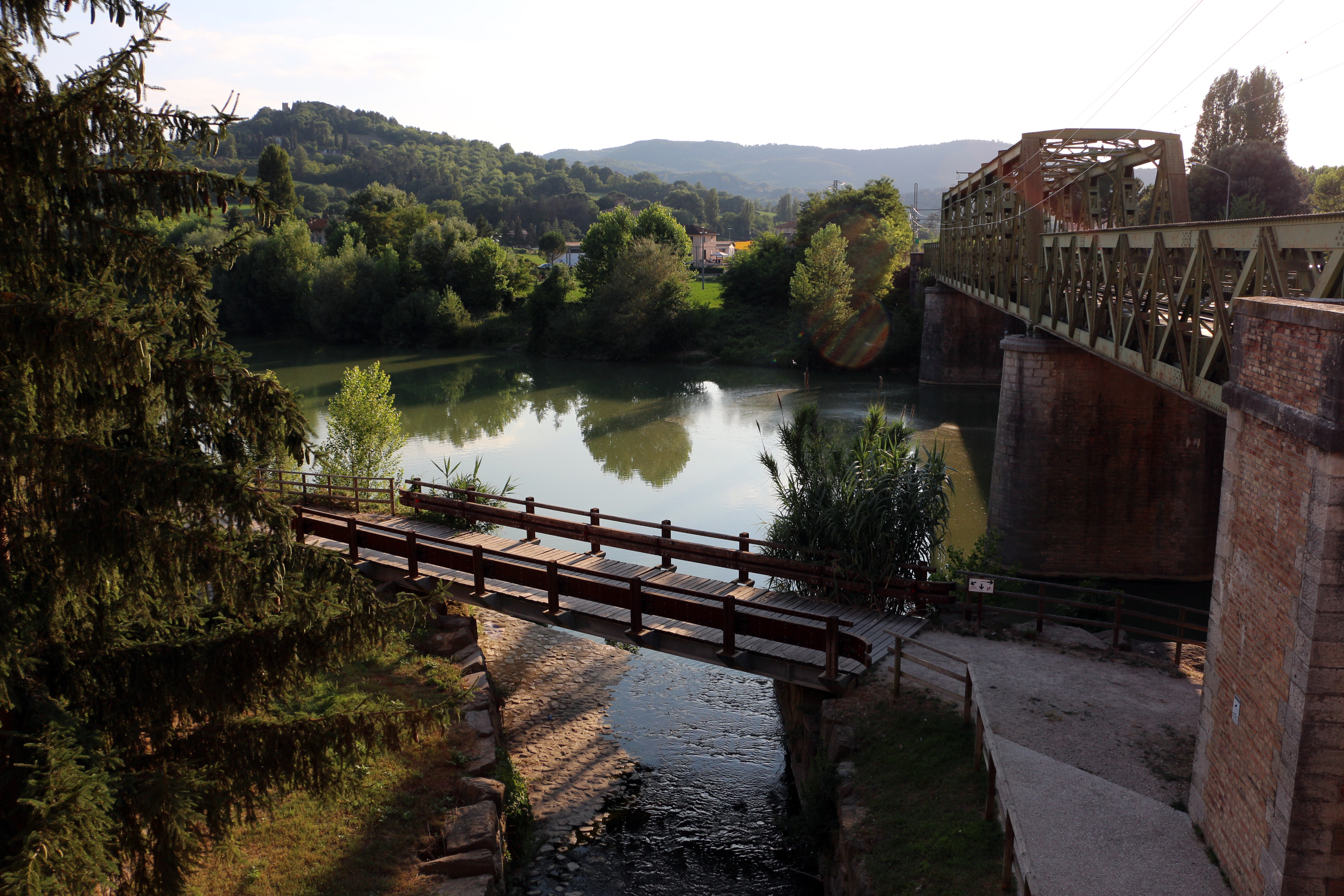
Confluence of the Reggia stream with the Tiber at Umbertide

Umbertide lies on a plain on the left bank of the Tiber. The built area is largely composed of relatively recent buildings, while the oldest structure is the fortress constructed in the 14th century.

The town lies at a distance of 20 miles (32 km) from Perugia and 12 miles (19 km) from Città di Castello. A road connects, near the bridge over the Niccone stream about 2 miles (3.2 km) away, with Cortona, located 20 miles (32 km) distant. Further roads lead to Gubbio at 16 miles (26 km), and to Montone.

The climate is described as temperate, with humid and foggy conditions in autumn and cold winters.

=== Subdivisions ===
The municipality includes the localities of Calzolaro, Cioccolanti, Comunaglia, La Mita, Molino Vitelli, Montecastelli, Niccone, Pian d'Assino, Pierantonio, Polgeto, Preggio, Spedalicchio, Umbertide, Verna.

In 2021, 2,138 people lived in rural dispersed dwellings not assigned to any named locality. At the time, the most populous locality was Umbertide proper (11,048).

==== Civitella Ranieri ====
Civitella Ranieri is a settlement of ancient origin and was formerly a fief of the Counts Ranieri, from whom it takes its name. It stands on a hill about 1 mile (1.6 km) from Umbertide. The castle is well maintained and has crenellated towers.

In the mid-19th century, it had a population of 412 inhabitants, divided between the two parishes of San Cristoforo and San Giovanni Evangelista di Serra Portuzio. Its population had declined to 19 by 1971. The settlement does not appear as a separate locality in later census records.

In 1701, Civitella Ranieri was a feudal domain of Count Ranieri, a status which it retained in 1803.

The Ranieri family remained prominent in the 19th century, when the leading family was that of Count Ruggero Ranieri of Perugia; an ancestor of the same name, Ruggero Cane Ranieri, was a supreme commander of the Venetians.

== Economy ==
In the 19th century the town's inhabitants were chiefly engaged in commerce. The surrounding territory produced wine, olive oil and cereals. There was also trade in building stone, flint used for millstones, ochre clay for pottery, and timber.

Local industry included an organ factory operated by the Martinelli brothers, as well as artisans such as blacksmiths, carpenters, tailors, and shoemakers. Particularly noted were the manufactures of decorated warming pans and fine terracotta vessels, which were traded widely.

Umbertide currently has several factories supporting the automotive industry, including Tiberina Holding Srl, a car components group. Other important companies are Proma SpA, Modulo Srl, and Terex Italia Srl manufacturing under the Genie brandname.

== Religion ==
=== Santa Maria della Reggia ===
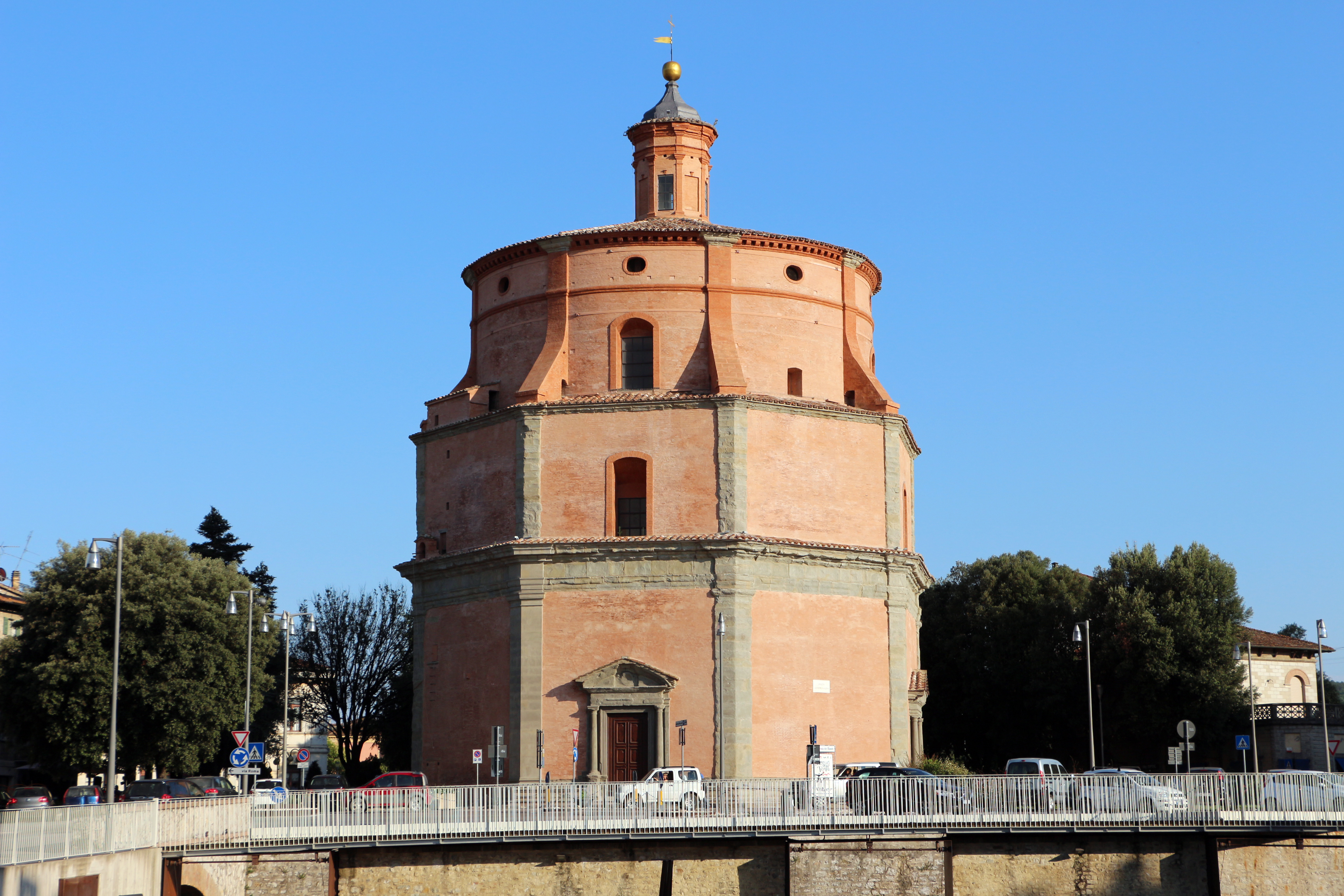
The church of Santa Maria della Reggia

The church of Santa Maria della Reggia stands beyond the bridge over the Reggia stream. Construction began in 1559 to a design by Galeazzo Alessi and Giulio Danti and was completed in 1663.

The structure has an octagonal exterior and a circular interior, with sixteen detached columns supporting the entablature and a dome rising to 40 metres (130 ft) in height. Behind the high altar is a 15th-century fresco of Umbrian influence depicting the Madonna with Child and two saints, while above the organ loft is the Transfiguration by Niccolò Circignani (1578).

The church also preserves works by Domenico Vairin, Laudati and Scaramuccia, as well as a sculpted tabernacle dated 1535.

=== Santa Croce ===
The church of Santa Croce, located in Piazza San Francesco beside the churches of San Francesco and San Bernardino, stands on the site of an earlier 13th-century church dedicated to Saints Peter and Paul, associated with a confraternity later known as Santa Croce. Its present form largely dates from a reconstruction carried out between 1634 and 1645, with a late Baroque brick façade added in the early 18th century.

The interior, richly decorated with stuccoes by Giovanni Fontana (1676), contains altars from the 18th century, including one made in 1711 to house the Deposition from the Cross by Luca Signorelli (1516). The church was restored and converted into the Museum of Santa Croce in 1998. It also houses works transferred from San Francesco, including paintings by Niccolò Circignani and a wooden sculpture attributed to Romano Alberti. The cloister preserves medieval inscriptions and some from Roman times.

=== San Francesco ===
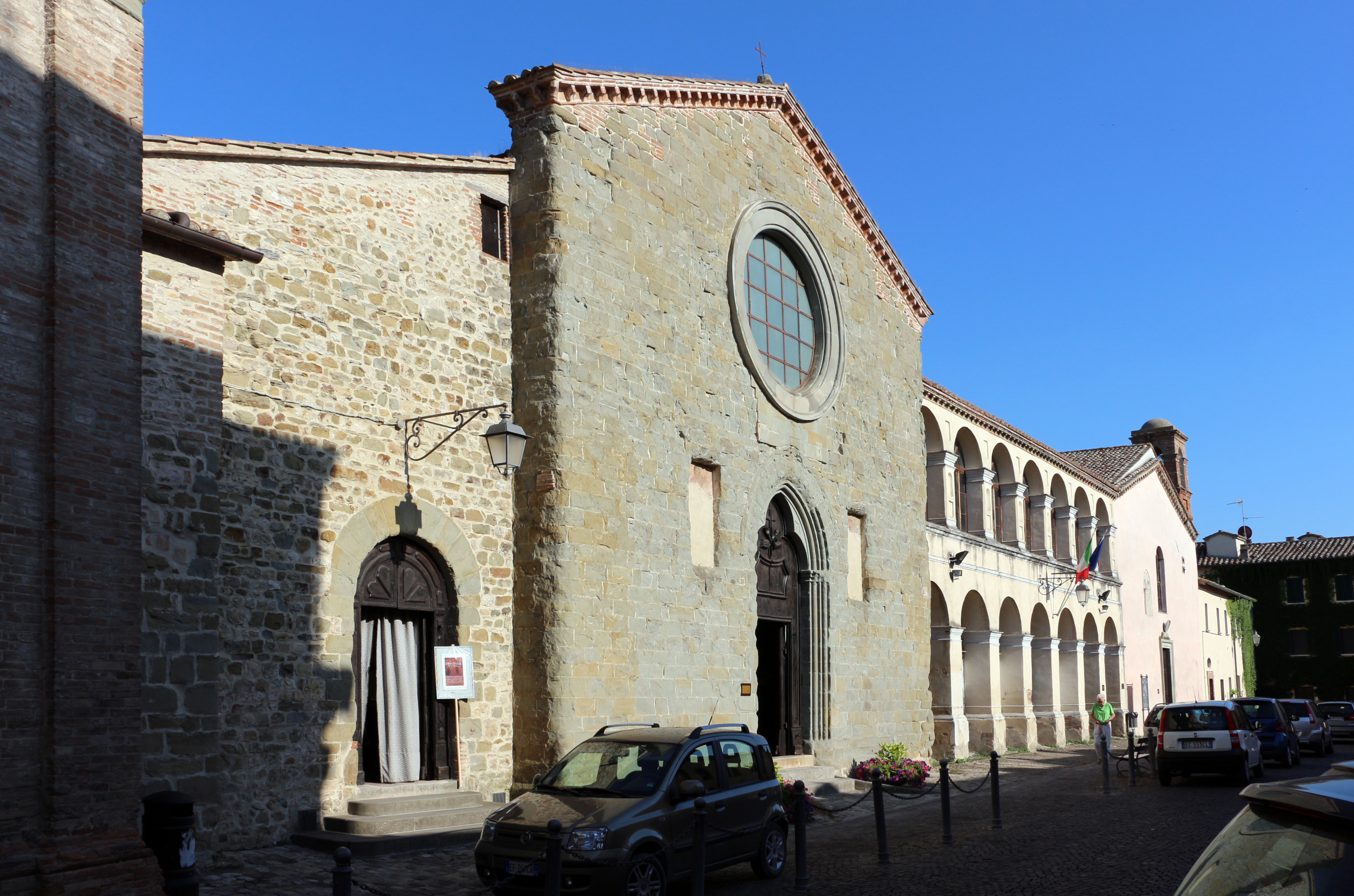
Church of San Francesco

The church of San Francesco is located near the church of San Bernardino. Its façade is built of stone blocks and features a trilobed arched portal of the 14th century surmounted by a large oculus.

The interior, with a Gothic apse, follows a Franciscan plan with two naves, the smaller of which has pointed arches. The adjoining former convent now houses the municipal historical archive and the civic library.

=== Santa Maria della Pietà ===
The church of Santa Maria della Pietà was built in 1481 and enlarged during the 16th century. It has a Renaissance layout with a single nave. Above the entrance portal is a lunette attributed to Giovanni Battista Caporali. The church formerly housed the Coronation of the Virgin painted by Pinturicchio in 1502, now preserved in the Vatican Museums in Rome.

=== San Bernardino ===
The church of San Bernardino is located next to the cloister of San Francesco. Founded as an oratory in 1426, it underwent several modifications before being almost entirely rebuilt in 1768. The façade is topped by a small lateral bell tower. Inside are preserved a Last Supper by Muzio Flori (1602) and a 16th-century wooden statue of Saint Bernardino.

=== Abbey of San Salvatore di Montecorona ===
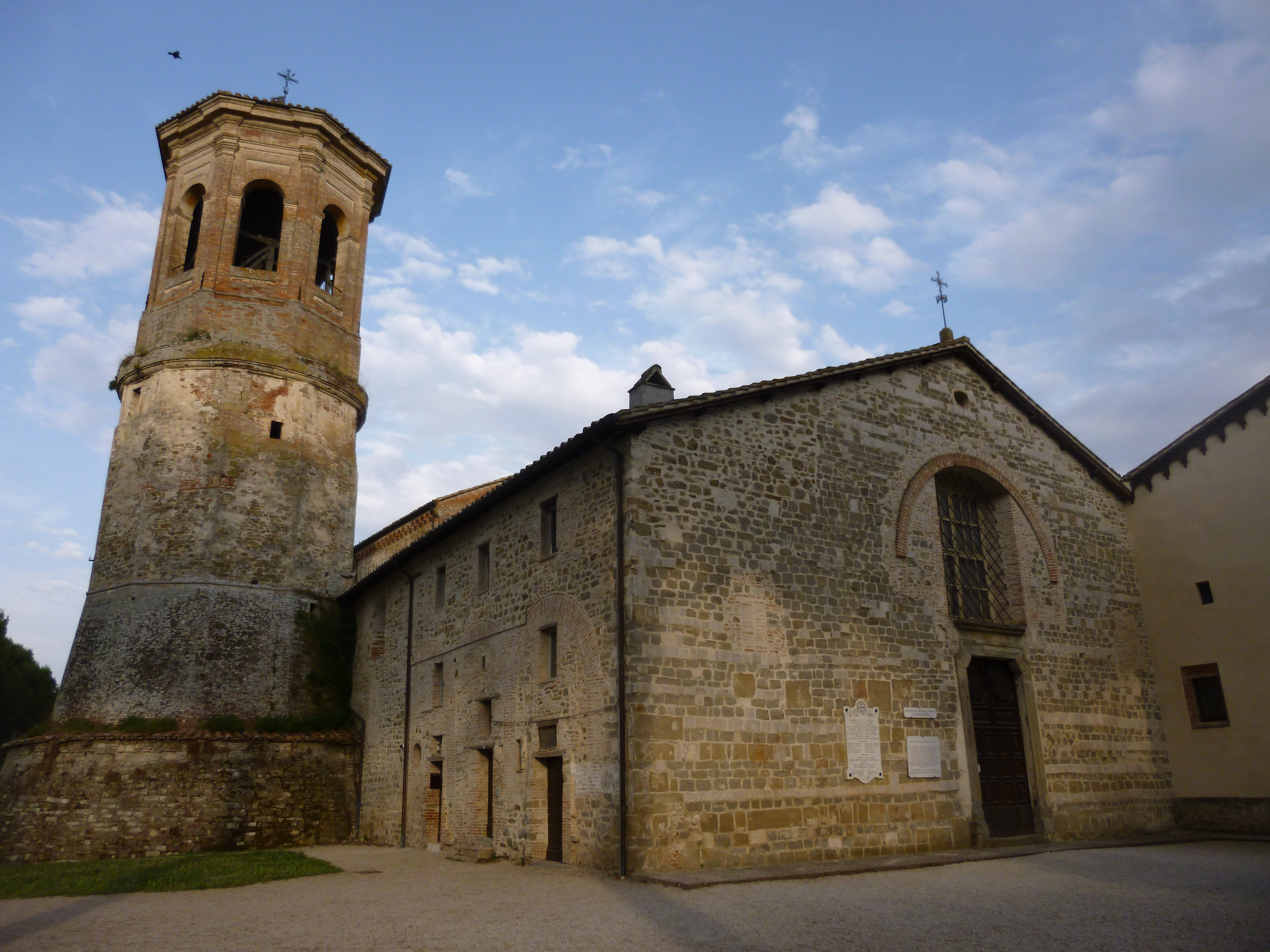
Abbey of San Salvatore di Montecorona

The Abbey of San Salvatore di Montecorona is closely linked to the Camaldolese order. It was probably founded by Saint Romuald in 1008–1009, and in 1050 Saint Peter Damiani acted there as a reformer. Over time it became the center of economic activities connected to a large estate, which is still among the largest agricultural enterprises in the region.

The upper church, of Romanesque origin, was consecrated in 1105 and later modified in the 16th and 17th centuries. Its interior has three naves, with frescoes of Umbrian school dating to the 14th century. The raised presbytery with a Gothic apse contains an 8th-century ciborium with relief decoration and a 16th-century choir.

The complex also includes a polygonal bell tower, possibly derived in the 14th century from an earlier watchtower, and beneath the church lies the crypt of Santa Maria delle Grazie, probably dating to the 11th century. The crypt is divided into five naves with three apses and has ribbed vaults supported by Roman and medieval columns, suggesting the possible presence of an earlier place of worship.

=== Hermitage of Montecorona ===
The hermitage of Montecorona stands at an elevation of 700 metres (2,300 ft). Established in the 16th century and built beginning in 1530, it was intended for the Camaldolese hermits of Saint Romuald who sought a stricter eremitical life. It maintained a close relationship with the abbey of San Salvatore below, to which it was connected by a paved road.

The complex consists of a church dating to the 18th century with stucco decorations and a group of small monastic dwellings. Following the suppression of religious orders it became secular property and served as a refuge during periods of war. After a long period of abandonment, the site was reoccupied in 1981; it is now inhabited by monks of the Monastic Family of Bethlehem.

=== Other religious buildings ===
The church of Sant'Erasmo was built on earlier remains, variously considered Roman or dating to the 11th century. Its structure includes a central pillar supporting vaulted sections, with traces of fresco decoration linked to the school of Margaritone.

The church of San Giovanni Battista was elevated to a collegiate church in 1765 by Pope Clement XIII. It has a circular form and is served by ten canons, with the dignities of archpriest and provost, who oversee the two inner parishes. The church contains an organ and a chapel with a resident music director.

The church of the Conventual Franciscans houses an organ and an altarpiece by Niccolò Circignani. It also contains two notable chapels, dedicated to the Immaculate Conception and to Saint Roch, the latter featuring a sculpted statue.

The church of the Observant Franciscans formerly housed a painting by Pietro Perugino, later transferred to the Vatican collections. An exterior fresco above the entrance is attributed to his school.

== Culture ==
=== Castle of Civitella Ranieri ===
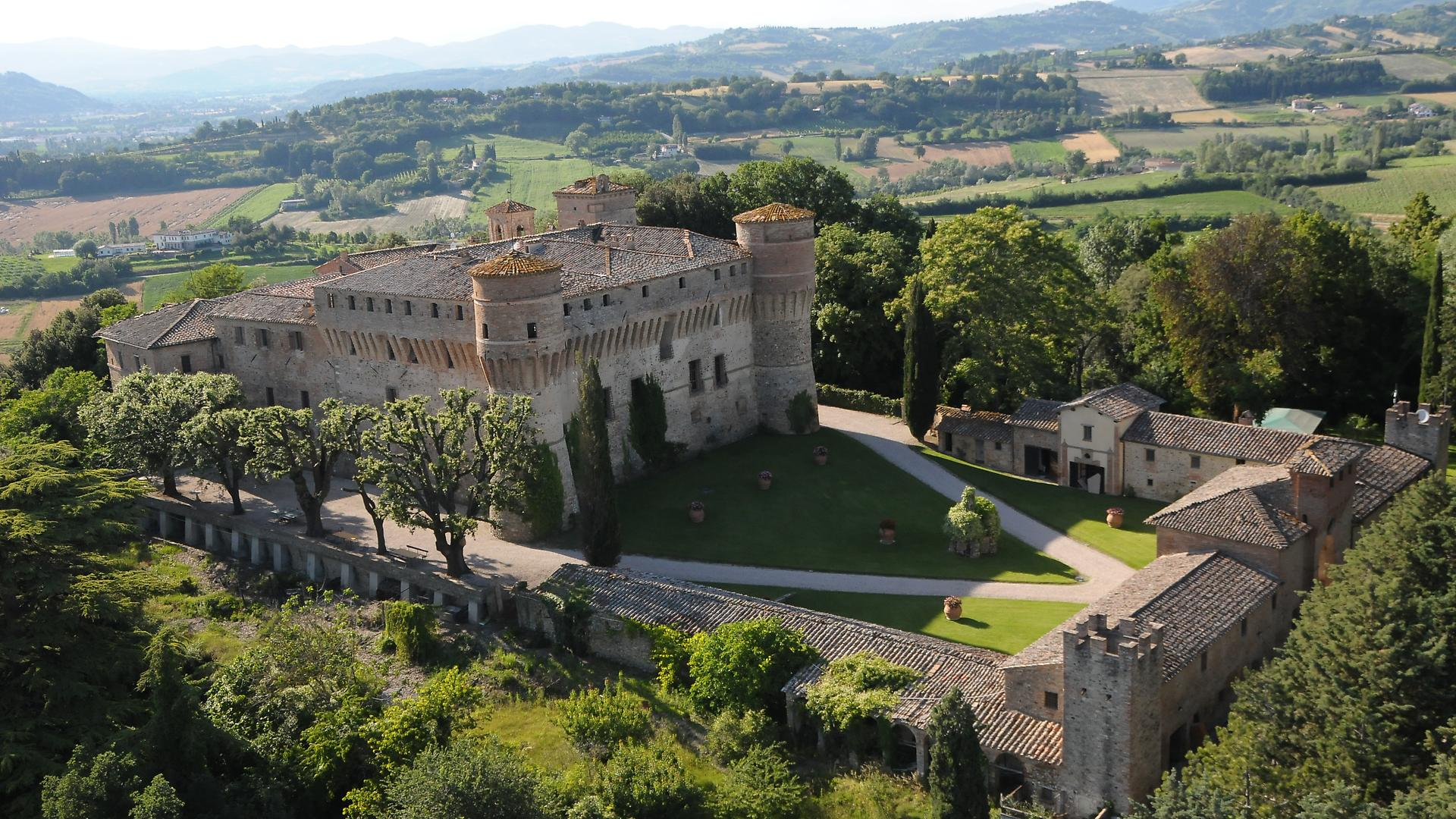
The castle of Civitella Ranieri

The castle of Civitella Ranieri stands in a panoramic position overlooking the Assino valley. It takes its name from a fortified settlement built in 1078 by Umberto, son of Raniero, brother of the duke William of Montferrat.

Little remains of the original 11th-century fortress, as it was destroyed in 1492 during conflicts between the Baglioni and the Degli Oddi. The present complex is a Renaissance military reconstruction dating to the 15th century. It is characterized by cylindrical corner towers, a square keep on the north-east side, and a system of walls with walkways.

The castle includes a church added in the 18th century. The complex is enclosed by a park extending over the surrounding slopes.

=== Archeology ===
The village of Preggio, near the border with the municipality of Passignano sul Trasimeno, preserves traces of ancient settlement. Remains of Etruscan walls dating to the 4th century BC are found on Monte Murlo to the north. The area, once known as Bellona or Bellonia, occupied a strategic position along routes connecting Perugia with Cortona and linking the upper Tiber Valley to Lake Trasimeno.

=== Other cultural heritage ===
The Palazzo Comunale preserves an important public archive containing medieval and later documents, including a 1521 manuscript of the statutes of Fratta and notarial records from 1374 to 1868.

Casa Santini houses a large collection of engravings, including works attributed to Dürer and other artists. Casa Mavarelli contains collections of ceramics from Gubbio and Deruta and paintings attributed to various schools and artists.

In the surrounding area are several medieval castles, including those of Civitella Ranieri, Serra Partucci, Montalto and Montecastelli, as well as fortresses such as Remeggio, Polgeto and Montacuto.

Within the town stands the Rocca of Umbertide a tower in which Braccio da Montone was imprisoned in 1393 before being freed by Biordo Michelotti; it later served as a place of detention.

== Notable people ==
Among those originating from Umbertide are Filippo Alberti, a 16th-century man of letters and associate of Torquato Tasso; Andrea Cibo, physician to popes including Pope Clement VII; Pietro Giacomo Petrogalli, a statesman and military figure in the service of Ferdinand III of Tuscany; Orazio Mancini, a jurist involved in several conclaves; Ciotto Paolucci, military commander in the service of the Venetian Republic; Antonio Guerrini, a 19th-century scholar; and Giovanni Santini, professor of ornament and architecture at the academy of Perugia.

The Ranieri family, particularly Uberto Ranieri and his descendants, played a significant role in the establishment and early history of the town.
