= Band gap =

Energy range in a solid where no electron states exist

Graph of carbon atoms being brought together to form a diamond crystal, demonstrating formation of the electronic band structure and band gap. The right graph shows the energy levels as a function of the spacing between atoms. When far apart (right side of graph) all the atoms have discrete valence orbitals p and s with the same energies. However, when the atoms come closer (left side), their electron orbitals begin to spatially overlap and hybridize into N molecular orbitals each with a different energy, where N is the number of atoms in the crystal. Since N is such a large number, adjacent orbitals are extremely close together in energy so the orbitals can be considered a continuous energy band. At the actual diamond crystal cell size (denoted by a), two bands are formed, called the valence and conduction bands, separated by a 5.5 eV band gap. The Pauli exclusion principle limits the number of electrons in a single orbital to two, and the bands are filled beginning with the lowest energy.

In solid-state physics and solid-state chemistry, a band gap, also called a bandgap or energy gap, is an energy range in a solid where no electronic states exist. In graphs of the electronic band structure of solids, the band gap refers to the energy difference (often expressed in electronvolts) between the top of the valence band and the bottom of the conduction band in insulators and semiconductors. It is the energy required to promote an electron from the valence band to the conduction band. The resulting conduction-band electron (and the electron hole in the valence band) are free to move within the crystal lattice and serve as charge carriers to conduct electric current. It is closely related to the HOMO–LUMO gap in chemistry. If the valence band is completely full and the conduction band is completely empty, then electrons cannot move within the solid because there are no available states. If the electrons are not free to move within the crystal lattice, then there is no generated current due to no net charge carrier mobility. However, if some electrons transfer from the valence band (mostly full) to the conduction band (mostly empty), then current can flow (see carrier generation and recombination). Therefore, the band gap is a major factor determining the electrical conductivity of a solid. Substances having large band gaps (also called "wide" band gaps) are generally insulators, those with small band gaps (also called "narrow" band gaps) are semiconductors, and conductors either have very small band gaps or none, because the valence and conduction bands overlap to form a continuous band.

It is possible to produce laser induced insulator-metal transitions which have already been experimentally observed in some condensed matter systems, like thin films of C_{60}, doped manganites, or in vanadium sesquioxide V_{2}O_{3}. These are special cases of the more general metal-to-nonmetal transitions phenomena which were intensively studied in the last decades. A one-dimensional analytic model of laser induced distortion of band structure was presented for a spatially periodic (cosine) potential. This problem is periodic both in space and time and can be solved analytically using the Kramers-Henneberger co-moving frame. The solutions can be given with the help of the Mathieu functions.

== In semiconductor physics ==
Semiconductor band structure.

Every solid has its own characteristic energy-band structure. This variation in band structure is responsible for the wide range of electrical characteristics observed in various materials. Depending on the dimension, the band structure and spectroscopy can vary. The different types of dimensions are as listed: one dimension, two dimensions, and three dimensions.

In semiconductors and insulators, electrons are confined to a number of bands of energy, and forbidden from other regions because there are no allowable electronic states for them to occupy. The term "band gap" refers to the energy difference between the top of the valence band and the bottom of the conduction band. Electrons are able to jump from one band to another. However, in order for a valence band electron to be promoted to the conduction band, it requires a specific minimum amount of energy for the transition. This required energy is an intrinsic characteristic of the solid material. Electrons can gain enough energy to jump to the conduction band by absorbing either a phonon (heat) or a photon (light).

A semiconductor is a material with an intermediate-sized, non-zero band gap that behaves as an insulator at T=0K, but allows thermal excitation of electrons into its conduction band at temperatures that are below its melting point. In contrast, a material with a large band gap is an insulator. In conductors, the valence and conduction bands may overlap, so there is no longer a bandgap with forbidden regions of electronic states.

The conductivity of intrinsic semiconductors is strongly dependent on the band gap. The only available charge carriers for conduction are the electrons that have enough thermal energy to be excited across the band gap and the electron holes that are left off when such an excitation occurs.

Band-gap engineering is the process of controlling or altering the band gap of a material by controlling the composition of certain semiconductor alloys, such as GaAlAs, InGaAs, and InAlAs. It is also possible to construct layered materials with alternating compositions by techniques like molecular-beam epitaxy. These methods are exploited in the design of heterojunction bipolar transistors (HBTs), laser diodes and solar cells.

The distinction between semiconductors and insulators is a matter of convention. One approach is to think of semiconductors as a type of insulator with a narrow band gap. Insulators with a larger band gap, usually greater than 4 eV, are not considered semiconductors and generally do not exhibit semiconductive behaviour under practical conditions. Electron mobility also plays a role in determining a material's informal classification.

The band-gap energy of semiconductors tends to decrease with increasing temperature. When temperature increases, the amplitude of atomic vibrations increase, leading to larger interatomic spacing. The interaction between the lattice phonons and the free electrons and holes will also affect the band gap to a smaller extent. The relationship between band gap energy and temperature can be described by Varshni's empirical expression (named after Y. P. Varshni),

$E_g(T)=E_g(0)-\frac{\alpha T^2}{T+\beta}$, where E_{g}(0), α and β are material constants.

Furthermore, lattice vibrations increase with temperature, which increases the effect of electron scattering. Additionally, the number of charge carriers within a semiconductor will increase, as more carriers have the energy required to cross the band-gap threshold and so conductivity of semiconductors also increases with increasing temperature. The external pressure also influences the electronic structure of semiconductors and, therefore, their optical band gaps.

In a regular semiconductor crystal, the band gap is fixed owing to continuous energy states. In a quantum dot crystal, energy states are discretized due to the quantum confinement effect. Energy states in the conduction band are pushed upwards in energy, while those in the valence band are pushed downwards, causing the effective band gap to grow with decreasing dot size.

Band gaps can be either direct or indirect, depending on the electronic band structure of the material.

It was mentioned earlier that the dimensions have different band structure and spectroscopy. For non-metallic solids, which are one dimensional, have optical properties that are dependent on the electronic transitions between valence and conduction bands. In addition, the spectroscopic transition probability is between the initial and final orbital and it depends on the following integral:$\int {\varphi^*_f \hat{\mu}_\epsilon \varphi_i d\tau}$. Where $\varphi_i$is the initial orbital, $\varphi_f$ is the final orbital, $\hat{\mu}_\epsilon$ is the transition dipole operator, and $d\tau$ is the element of volume over all the space for integration.

Two-dimensional structures of solids behave because of the overlap of atomic orbitals. The simplest two-dimensional crystal contains identical atoms arranged on a square lattice. Energy splitting occurs at the Brillouin zone edge for one-dimensional situations because of a weak periodic potential, which produces a gap between bands. The behavior of the one-dimensional situations does not occur for two-dimensional cases because there are extra freedoms of motion. Furthermore, a bandgap can be produced with strong periodic potential for two-dimensional and three-dimensional cases.

=== Direct and indirect band gap ===
Based on their band structure, materials are characterised with a direct band gap or indirect band gap. In the free-electron model, k is the momentum of a free electron and assumes unique values within the Brillouin zone that outlines the periodicity of the crystal lattice. If the momentum of the lowest energy state in the conduction band and the highest energy state of the valence band of a material have the same value, then the material has a direct bandgap. If they are not the same, then the material has an indirect band gap and the electronic transition must undergo momentum transfer to satisfy conservation. Such indirect "forbidden" transitions still occur, however at very low probabilities and weaker energy. For materials with a direct band gap, valence electrons can be directly excited into the conduction band by a photon whose energy is larger than the bandgap. In contrast, for materials with an indirect band gap, a photon and phonon must both be involved in a transition from the valence band top to the conduction band bottom, involving a momentum change. Therefore, direct bandgap materials tend to have stronger light emission and absorption properties and tend to be better suited for photovoltaics (PVs), light-emitting diodes (LEDs), and laser diodes; however, indirect bandgap materials are frequently used in PVs and LEDs when the materials have other favorable properties.

=== Light-emitting diodes and laser diodes ===
LEDs and laser diodes usually emit photons with energy close to and slightly larger than the band gap of the semiconductor material from which they are made. Therefore, as the band gap energy increases, the LED or laser color changes from infrared to red, through the rainbow to violet, then to UV.

=== Photovoltaic cells ===
The Shockley–Queisser limit gives the maximum possible efficiency of a single-junction solar cell under un-concentrated sunlight, as a function of the semiconductor band gap. If the band gap is too high, most daylight photons cannot be absorbed; if it is too low, then most photons have much more energy than necessary to excite electrons across the band gap, and the rest is wasted. The semiconductors commonly used in commercial solar cells have band gaps near the peak of this curve, as it occurs in silicon-based cells. The Shockley–Queisser limit has been exceeded experimentally by combining materials with different band gap energies to make, for example, tandem solar cells.

The optical band gap determines what portion of the solar spectrum a photovoltaic cell absorbs. Strictly, a semiconductor will not absorb photons of energy less than the band gap; whereas most of the photons with energies exceeding the band gap will generate heat. Neither of them contribute to the efficiency of a solar cell.

=== List of band gaps ===
Below are band gap values for some selected materials. For a comprehensive list of band gaps in semiconductors, see List of semiconductor materials.

Group	Material	Symbol	Band gap (eV) @ 302 K	Thermal Conductivity (W/m⋅K)	References
III–V	Aluminium nitride	AlN	6.0		
IV	Diamond	C	5.5	1,350	
IV	Silicon	Si	1.14		
IV	Germanium	Ge	0.67		
III–V	Gallium nitride	GaN	3.4	233	
III–V	Gallium phosphide	GaP	2.26		
III–V	Gallium arsenide	GaAs	1.43		
IV–V	Silicon nitride	Si_{3}N_{4}	5		
IV–VI	Lead(II) sulfide	PbS	0.37		
IV–VI	Silicon dioxide	SiO_{2}	9		
	Copper(I) oxide	Cu_{2}O	2.1		

== Optical versus electronic bandgap ==
It is possible for an absorbed photon to have just enough energy to generate a bound electron–hole pair (an exciton), but not enough additional energy to separate the two against their mutual electrical attraction. The former energy is called the "optical band gap", while the energy to create an unbound pair so that a macroscopic electrical current will flow is the "electronic band gap" or "transport gap", and is greater than the former by the exciton binding energy.

In almost all inorganic semiconductors (silicon, gallium arsenide, etc.) there is very little interaction between electrons and holes, thus the exciton binding energy is very low, and the difference between the two gaps is usually ignored. However, in some systems, including organic semiconductors and single-walled carbon nanotubes, the distinction may be significant.

== Band gaps for other quasi-particles ==
In photonics, band gaps or stop bands are ranges of photon frequencies where, if tunneling effects are neglected, no photons can be transmitted through a material. A material exhibiting this behaviour is known as a photonic crystal. The concept of hyperuniformity has broadened the range of photonic band gap materials, beyond photonic crystals. By applying the technique in supersymmetric quantum mechanics, a new class of optical disordered materials has been suggested, which support band gaps perfectly equivalent to those of crystals or quasicrystals.

Similar physics applies to phonons in a phononic crystal.

== Materials ==
- Aluminium gallium arsenide
- Boron nitride
- Indium gallium arsenide
- Indium arsenide
- Gallium arsenide
- Gallium nitride
- Germanium
- Metallic hydrogen

=== List of electronics topics ===
- Electronics
- Bandgap voltage reference
- Condensed matter physics
- Direct and indirect bandgaps
- Electrical conduction
- Electron hole
- Field-effect transistor
- Light-emitting diode
- Photodiode
- Photoresistor
- Photovoltaics
- Solar cell
- Solid state physics
- Semiconductor
- Semiconductor devices
- Strongly correlated material
- Valence band

== See also ==
- Wide-bandgap semiconductors
- Band bending
- Spectral density
- Pseudogap
- Tauc plot
- Moss–Burstein effect
- Urbach energy
