= You Lucky Dog (2010 film) =

- Written by: Kevin Commins
- Directed by: John Bradshaw
- Starring: Natasha Henstridge; Harry Hamlin; Anthony Lemke
- Theme music composer: Stacey Hersh
- Countries of origin: United States; Canada
- Original language: English

Production
- Cinematography: Russ Goozee
- Editor: Marvin Lawrence
- Running time: 120 minutes

Original release
- Release: June 26, 2010

You Lucky Dog is a 2010 American-Canadian made-for-TV film directed by Kevin Commins and starring Natasha Henstridge, Harry Hamlin and Anthony Lemke. It was written by John Bradshaw.

== Plot ==
After her mother's death, New York City fashion designer Lisa Rayborn returns to her hometown and family farm. Due to a weak economy, her brother Jim has converted the family business from a cattle farm into a sheep farm, despite their father's objections. To help out, Lisa decides she will stay to help on the farm. She adopts a Border Collie from the local animal shelter and trains it as a sheepdog, naming the dog Lucky. Jim and Lisa decide to enter Lucky in a sheep herding contest, but when a severe windstorm sparks a forest fire, Lucky helps rescue a girl named Kristina (who is lost and almost died) and brings her to safety. While doing so, Lucky's leg is burned, and it looks as if she will not be able to compete.

== Cast ==
- Natasha Henstridge as Lisa Rayborn
- Harry Hamlin as Jim Rayborn
- Lawrence Dane as Clay Rayborn
- Anthony Lemke as Don Lally
- Alex Cardillo as Alex
- Geri Hall as Bonnie
- Matthew Olver as Arena announcer
- Erin Pitt as Erin
- Janaya Stephens as Katie
- Maya Lowe as Maya
- Mason Posival as Mason
- Erin Pitt as Erin
- David Talbot as Mayor Schirmer
- Bill Lake as Sheriff Hoskins
- Derek McGrath as Bus Driver
- Candy Larson as Laurie
- Kristina Miller as Kristina
- Murray McRae as Rich Preston
- Keith Kemps as Minister
- James Longworth as EMT #1
- Kristine Klohk as Nancy
- Scott Wickware as Neil Ingram
- Bustin as Lucky
- Kim Purich as sheep wrangler

== Release ==
The film, which premiered on June 26, 2010 on cable network The Hallmark Channel, was primarily sponsored by Pedigree pet food company. The release of this movie coincides with The Pedigree Foundation's sixth annual Adoption Drive.
