= Santa Maria della Reggia, Umbertide =

Church in Umbria, Italy

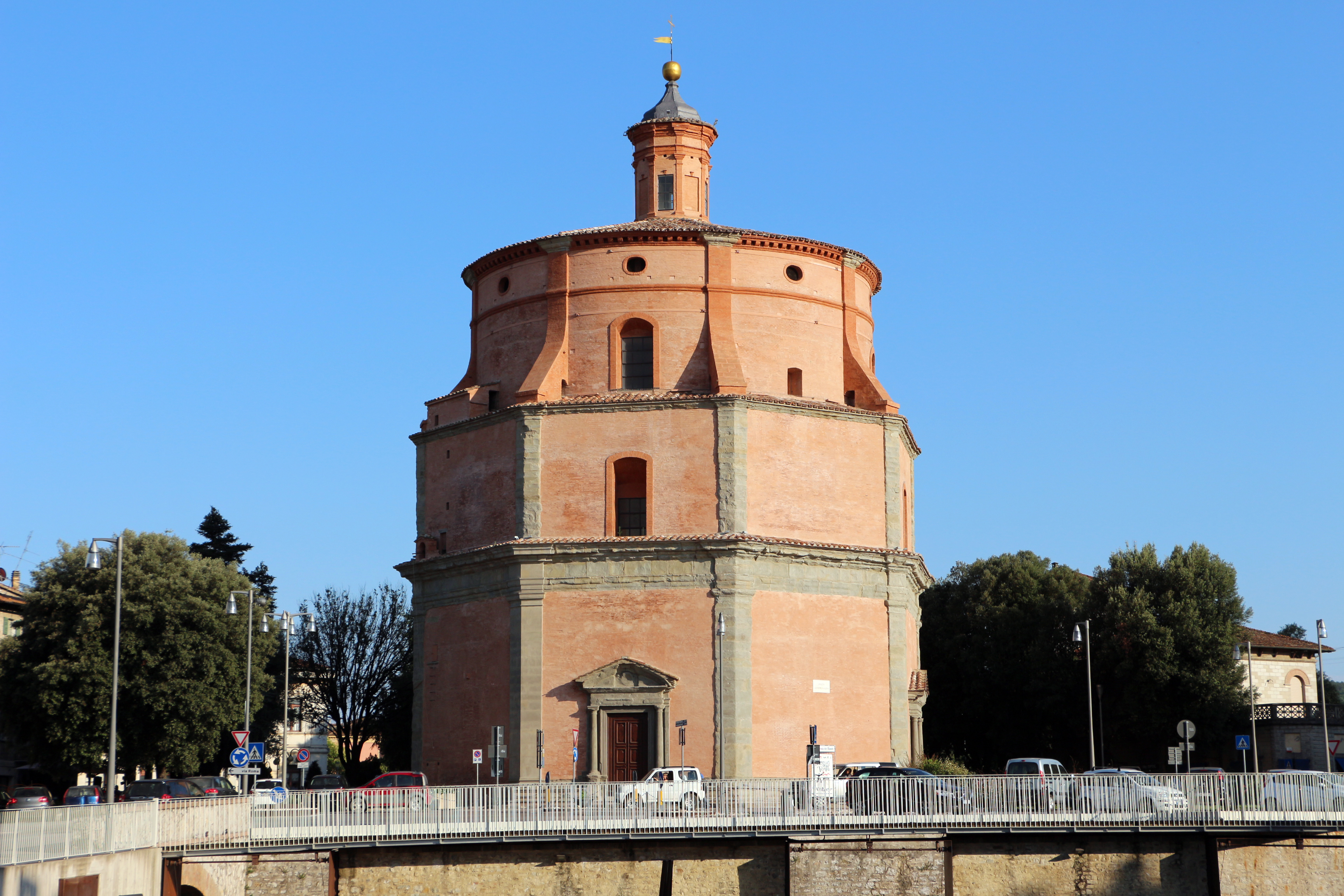
The church Santa Maria della Reggia

The Collegiata di Santa Maria della Reggia is a Renaissance-style, Roman Catholic church located in Umbertide, province of Perugia, region of Umbria, Italy. In 2015, it was part of the parish of San Giovanni Battista.

== History ==
The octagonal church is located in the center of town, in Piazza Mazzini, near the Rocca of Umbertide or town castle. The church has a painting depicting San Isidoro by the school of Guido Reni and an 18th-century Assumption of the Virgin. The design and construction of the church was begun in 1559 by Galeazzo Alessi and Giulio Danti; however construction continued until 1640. Other architects involved included Bino Sozi, Mariotto da Cortona (1600) and finally Bernardino Sermigni (1640). The interior is framed by a circle of 16 doric columns.

The interior of the church has a 15th-century Madonna and Child with Saints and Transfiguration (1578) by Niccolo Circignani. The church was built by the town to house a miraculous icon of the Virgin frescoed inside a nearby small chapel.
