= Ruggero Cane Ranieri =

14thC political figure from Perugia

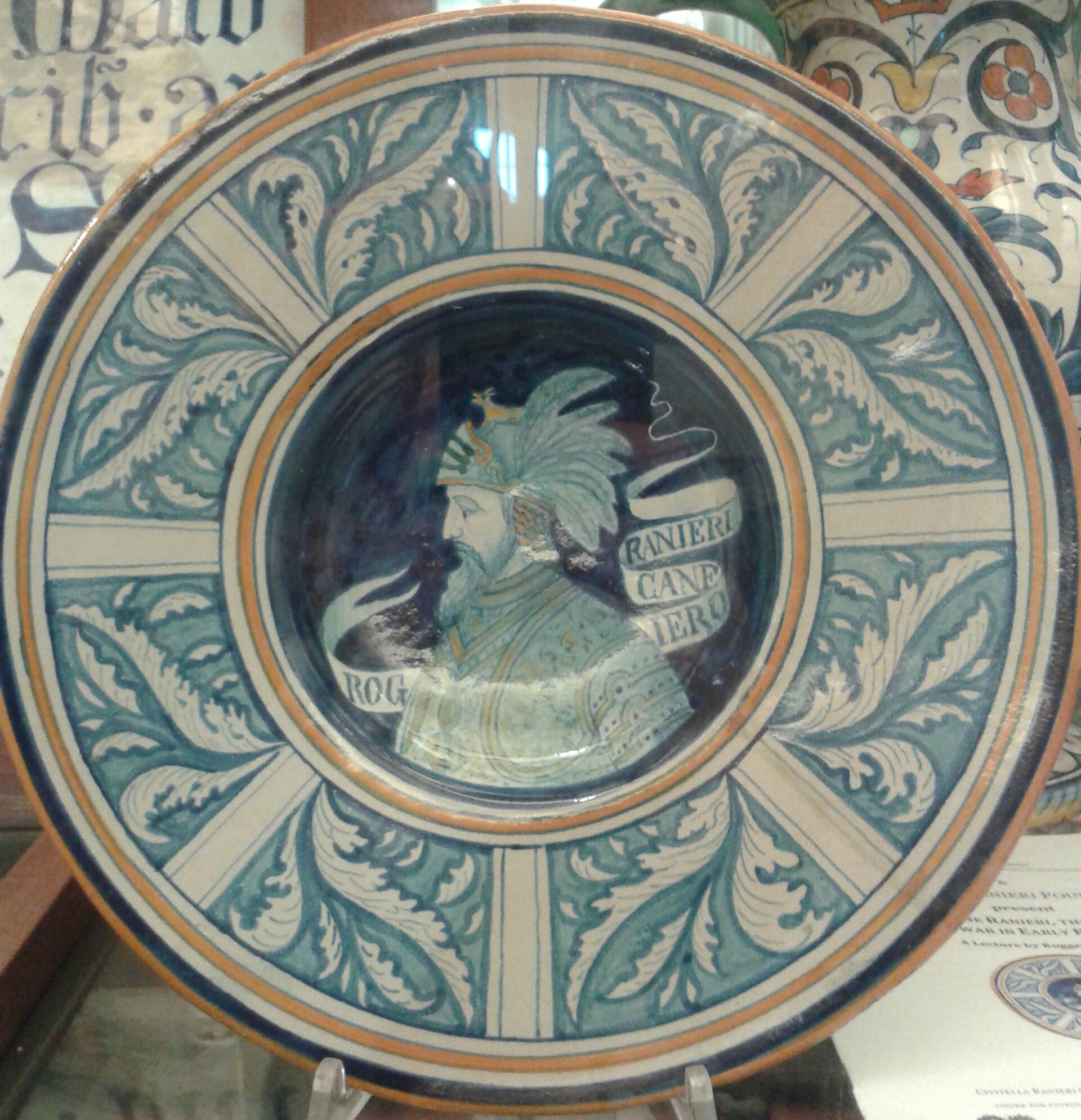
Angelo Micheletti, Plate with portrait of the military leader Ruggero Cane Ranieri, majolica, 1898 Deruta, Grazia Factory Museum

Ruggero Cane Ranieri ([unknown birth location], 14th century – Perugia, April 1441) was an Italian military leader and a major political figure in the city of Perugia during the first half of the 15th century. He was a member of the noble lineage of the Counts Ranieri of Civitella Ranieri, near Umbertide.

== Brief biography ==
There is very little information about Ruggero Cane Ranieri's early activities: records from the fourteenth and fifteenth centuries and various documents provide numerous details of a military leader named Ruggero. However, they extend over such a very wide chronological period, they cannot possibly refer to a single individual, but rather to two separate people: the first, also known by the name of Ruggero Cane, was a military man and diplomat in the fourteen seventies. He was a close friend of John Hawkwood (also known with his italian name: Giovanni Acuto) and a trusted person of Bernabò Visconti, dominant figure in Milan. The second is Ruggero, son of Costantino Ranieri (who then became better known as Ruggero "Cane" Ranieri) who, from the end of the fourteenth century, first served under Braccio Fortebracci da Montone and then became a leading light among the oligarchy of Perugia.

Recent historical research has identified the first Ruggero Cane as the father of Constantino Ranieri, father of "Ruggero "Cane" Ranieri.

The public figure of Ruggero "Cane" Ranieri only emerges at the beginning of the 15th century in the conflicts raging in and around Perugia between the nobility and the faction of the so-called “Raspanti”, representing the wealthy, powerful, corporative middle class in the town. The latter, led by Biordo Michelotti conquered the castle of Civitella Ranieri, the Ranieri family's property near Fratta (historic name of the town of Umbertide), which was sacked and destroyed. During the siege, many members of the Ranieri house lost their lives, whereas many of the survivors left for exile, which lasted until the "Raspanti" were defeated and the fortress of Civitella was recaptured by Ruggero in 1407.

== The battle of Motta di Livenza (1412) ==
Renowned for his military prowess, Ruggero Cane Ranieri is remembered above all for his service under the Venetian Republic, which he defended against the Hungarian imperial invaders and won a memorable victory during the battle of Motta di Livenza in Friuli in 1412. Together with the mercenary Crasso da Venosa, he intervened at a crucial moment and managed to reverse the outcome of the battle.

The historic events leading up to this act of war were as follows: Sigismund of Luxembourg (1369-1437), Emperor from 1410, managed to establish his authority over the kingdom of Hungary after many years of bloody battles, during which he fought against Ladislaus of Naples, (1377-1414), who claimed not only the Hungarian territories, but also the coastal areas of Dalmatia. Overcome by Sigismund, Ladislaus sold the areas he had claimed, including the town of Zara, to the Republic of Venice, which had always been extremely interested in dominating the Adriatic territories and in annexing Zara and Dalmatia and eagerly took the opportunity.

The annexation of these territories led the Serenissima to clash with the powerful Sigismund, whose troops included soldiers serving the Della Scala and the Da Carrara, lords of Verona and Padua, respectively, as well as other troops from Friuli-Venezia Giulia. The presence of Italian troops serving in the imperial army is in direct contrast with the historiography at the time of the battle, which aimed to mythicise this clash of war and create a contrast between the civilised Italian leaders and the semi-barbarian Hungarians. The raison d'être behind it lay in the strong resentment of many noble families and small landowners in the north-east who were continually struggling with Venetian hegemony.

Venice could rely on its economic power and recruited many of the best Italian mercenaries of the time, aided by the town militia. It organised its defence line along the banks of the River Livenza. Sigismund's troops, led by one of the most famous military leaders of Italian origin, Filippo degli Scolari (better known as Pippo Spano), moved against Venice in the autumn of 1411, and quickly captured Udine, Bassano and Feltre.

Venice initially offered a weak resistance, helped however by an effective diplomatic technique. The fact that Sigismund had also initially decided to resolve the question as peacefully as possible also helped. As a result, the imperial troops were called back across the Alps to wait for the battles to recommence the following spring of 1412. However, the Serenissima considered Sigismund's subsequent demands excessive and unjust (in addition to a request for a formal act of subjugation in the form of an annual gift of a white horse and a falcon for the Emperor, Sigismund also claimed the fortified towns of Dalmatia and, even more importantly, the right of free passage through Venetian territory, which would have guaranteed free access to the rest of Italy).

In view of the inevitable clash, Venice did all it could to fortify its defence lines and to form an army capable of fighting the imperial army. It also ensured the service of Ruggero Cane Ranieri in March 1412 and placed him at the head of 200 Paduan lancers. In August, the imperial troops made the first move and took the general of the Venetian troops Carlo I Malatesta da Rimini, by surprise. After an initial disadvantage, the Serenissima troops came back, thanks above all to the intervention of the cavalry led by Ruggero Cane Ranieri and his military companion Crasso da Venosa. Despite a large difference in number (600 Venetian cavalry against 3000 imperial soldiers), they were successful, thanks to a series of well executed manoeuvres to face the imperial front line, which enabled the Venetian troops to regroup behind the lines after the first assault suffered and be victorious: the day ended with the death of 1300 soldiers from Sigismund's contingent and with the capture of many Italian nobles who were fighting for the Emperor.

This battle is considered one of Ruggero Cane's major military undertakings and is also remembered as the real reason for his nickname, "Cane", understood as a mispronunciation of the title "Kahn", usually given to the great military leaders of the Orient and when pronounced by his soldiers automatically became "Cane". From then on, he permanently used this nickname, together with the effigy of a rampant dog on his crest. Furthermore, this image took on heraldic importance and went on to embellish the Ranieri family's coat of arms.

== Alongside Braccio da Montone and at the service of Perugia ==
He was a loyal military companion from 1398 of the mercenary Braccio Fortebraccio da Montone, head of the nobles and lords of Perugia from 12 July 1416. Ruggero Cane fought at his side in Umbria, Marche and Lazio against the papal army, and also took part in the 1417 siege of Castel Sant'Angelo. In 1419, he attacked Gubbio to snatch it from the dominion of the Montefeltro family.

Appointed governor of Montalboddo (ancient name of the town of Ostra, AN) by Pope Martin V in 1420, in 1421 he married a noblewoman from the Colonna family (Marzia or Giuditta), granddaughter of the Pope himself, from whom he obtained official confirmation of his renewed rule over the fiefdom of Civitella, which he had only formally recaptured by force.

On the death of Fortebraccio in 1424 during the War of L'Aquila, Ruggero played a leading role on the political scene in Perugia and was elected as one of ten local counsellors. He initially supported Oddo Fortebraccio, natural son of Braccio da Montone, who shortly became lord of Perugia. It was, however, a brief digression, following which he passed over to the opposite faction that warmly supported Perugia's subjugation to the Pope.

In August 1424, he was sent from Perugia, together with other legates, as ambassador to Pope Martin V to negotiate peace and the subjugation of Perugia to the Papal State. According to one report of the time, although Ruggero Cane did not travel directly to Rome (perhaps because he initially supported Oddo Fortebraccio and was extremely mistrustful of the Pope), on 28 August of that same year, he appears holding the Church banner among the retinue accompanying the entrance of the papal legate into the city.

On his death in 1441, he was ceremoniously buried in the cathedral of Perugia. Information on his public funeral can be found in the so-called Cronaca del Graziani:

«On18 April, the procession for the death of Rugiere de Costantino dei Ranieri began; 25 families rode through the city on horseback, all wearing flags. In front was the white banner with a red cross and the man carrying it was wearing the full armour he used to wear as captain of the Venetians when fighting alongside them. On 21 of the same month, a large procession was held with 70 men and women in ceremonial dress; and he was buried in the church of Santo Lorenzo, and the flags were placed in the chancel. On 22 of the same month they paid their respects to him with all the religious orders, and this was a very beautiful thing».

== Curiosities ==
A portrait of Ruggero Cane Ranieri hangs in one of the rooms in Palazzo Conestabile della Staffa, which houses the Augusta Library of the Municipality of Perugia. The work by an unknown artist can be dated back to around the 19th century and was restored in 1998.

== See also ==
- Ranieri (family)
