= Mouth Sounds =

Mixtape by Neil Cicierega
- Released: April 27, 2014
- Recorded: 2012–2014
- Genre: Mashup; remix
- Length: 56:08

Neil Cicierega chronology
Nature Tapes (as Lemon Demon) (2014)	Mouth Sounds (2014)	Mouth Silence (2014)

Mouth Sounds is a mashup mixtape by American musician Neil Cicierega. The mixtape was self-released by Cicierega on April 27, 2014. Consisting of mashups pairing Top 40 hits of the 1980s and 1990s, Mouth Sounds received positive reviews from music critics. It received a second installment, Mouth Silence, three months later, which followed the same mashup format, a third installment, Mouth Moods, in 2017, and a fourth installment, Mouth Dreams, in 2020.

== Background ==
"When I decided to mash up Smash Mouth with John Lennon, of course I was thinking, 'This is super blasphemous, this is designed to make people angry.'"

— Neil Cicierega explains his thinking behind the creation of the track "Imagine All Star People"

Cicierega began work on the mixtape after discovering multiple raw instrument tracks from songs featured on the music video game series Rock Band. Because Rock Band requires players to control individual instruments for each track, all artists featured in Rock Band must provide the stems of each song featured in the game. With access to these tracks, Cicierega was able to create mashups of the provided songs. The process was mostly trial and error, where he paired songs together randomly, and kept what sounded good. Cicierega tried to only pull popular songs, explaining "If you're doing a comedy album with mashups, then you definitely want to use songs that people will recognize." The purpose of the mixtape was to make Cicierega laugh, but also to offend fans of the songs and artists he used in the mixtape.

Mouth Sounds' development dates as far back as late 2012. Later on, the song "No Credit Card" (a remix of Huey Lewis and the News' "The Power of Love") appeared on Neil Cicierega's SoundCloud account on February 6, 2013. Over the following year, rougher edits of the songs "Vivid Memories Turn to Fantasies," "The Sharpest Tool," "Modest Mouth," "Imma Let It Be," "Like Tears in Chocolate Rain," "Melt Everyone," and "Smooth Flow," would be uploaded to the same SoundCloud, with the final track, "Mullet with Butterfly Wings," dropping just over a week before Mouth Sounds itself was released. In addition, Cicierega posted a music video for "The Sharpest Tool" (titled "MOUTH") to his main YouTube channel a year earlier on February 9, 2013.

== Reception ==
Mouth Sounds received mostly positive reviews from critics. Katie Rife, writing for The A.V. Club, called the mixtape "brilliant," citing its ability to toy with the listener's nostalgia held towards the songs included, and wrapped up her review by suggesting the album to those that enjoy the thought of "dropping acid at a Media Play going-out-of-business sale." Ben Simon of Music Putty also wrote of Mouth Sounds' ability to relate to the listener's childhood memories, writing, "nostalgia is the album’s unifying theme," and citing the third track, "D'oh," as an example of when it "is taken to its most equally incredible and horrific extreme."

== Track listing ==
No.	Title	Length
1.	"Promenade (Satellite Pictures at an Exhibition)"	1:25
2.	"Modest Mouth"	3:47
3.	"D'oh"	1:54
4.	"Vivid Memories Turn to Fantasies"	2:44
5.	"Bills Like Jean Spirit"	4:45
6.	"Full Mouth"	2:17
7.	"Alanis"	1:22
8.	"Imagine All Star People"	3:00
9.	"Imma Let It Be"	2:07
10.	"Daft Mouth"	3:03
11.	"Like Tears in Chocolate Rain"	3:52
12.	"No Credit Card"	5:07
13.	"Bega Interlude"	0:25
14.	"Melt Everyone"	4:53
15.	"The Sharpest Tool"	2:39
16.	"Mullet with Butterfly Wings"	6:20
17.	"Smooth Flow"	6:29
Total length:		56:08
