= Castello di Polgeto =

Italian castle

Coordinates: 43.286721°N 12.302413°E

The Castello di Polgeto is a medieval castle near Mount Acuto, near the town of Umbertide, in the province of Perugia, in the Italian region of Umbria.

== History ==
This castle was erected in 1399 around a prior 12th century fortification, which belonged to Biagio di Buto, an exile from Perugia. A number of inhabitants gravitated to the site and the churches of San Lorenzo and of the Madonna del Sasso were erected. During the war between the Papacy and Florence in 1643, the castle was captured by the Tuscans.

In the 19th century, the castle became property of Count Francesco Guardabassi, a statesman from the region. During World War II, the castle was briefly headquarters for the German army Field Marshal Albert Kesselring. Count Guardabbassi's daughter-in-law died in 1955, and the heirs sold the property. In 1989 it was used to house a number of vacation rental properties; a short vacation diary was featured in the New York Times.
