= Busti =

Busti may refer to:

== People ==
- Agostino Busti (c. 1483–1548), Italian sculptor
- Alessandro Busti (born 2000), Canadian soccer goalkeeper
- Francesco Busti (1678–1767), Italian painter
- Jorge Busti (1947–2021), Argentine politician
- Paul Busti (1749–1824), Italian American businessman; chief operations officer of the Holland Land Company
- Cristina Cremer de Busti, Argentine politician

== Places ==
- Busti, New York, US, a town
  - Busti (CDP), New York, a hamlet in the town

== See also ==
- Abu al-Fath al-Busti (942–1010), Persian poet
- Abu Hatim Muhammad ibn Hibban ibn Ahmad al-Tamimi al-Busti (c. 884–965), or Ibn Hibban, Muslim Arab scholar
- Bust (disambiguation)
