= Ranieri (family) =

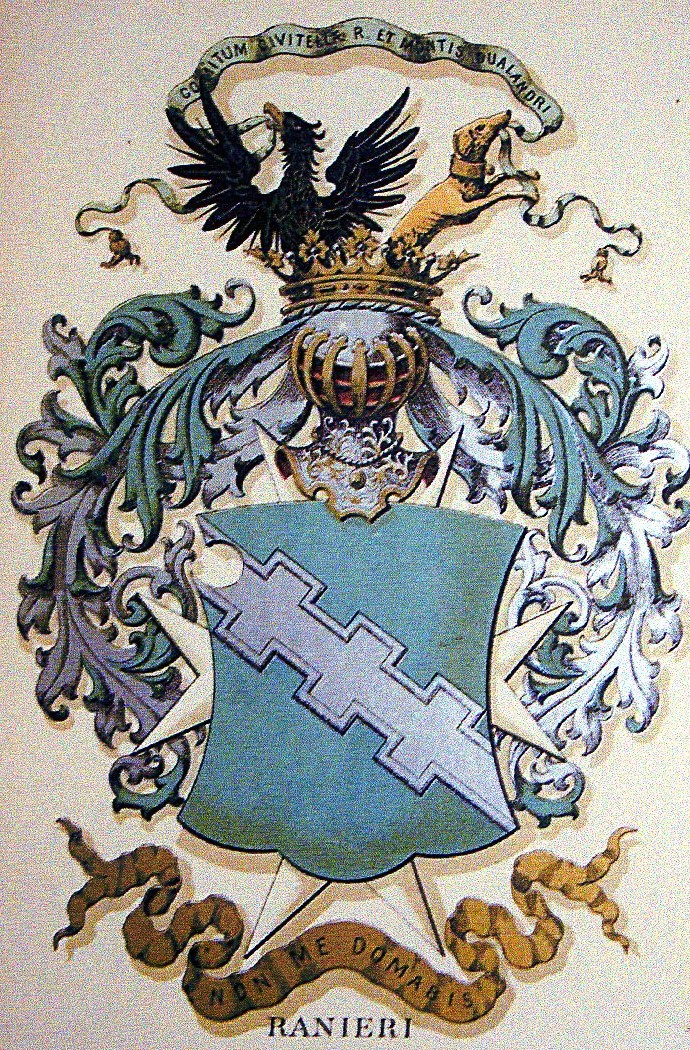
- Country: Papal States; Kingdom of Italy
- Founded: 1078
- Founder: Ranieri I (... – ...)
- Final ruler: Ruggero V (1791-1863)
- Titles: Counts of Civitella Ranieri
- Estate: Civitella Ranieri
- Deposition: 1817 - end of the feudal dominion over Civitella Ranieri with annexation to the Papal State
- Cadet branches: Gubbio; Orvieto; Ragusa/Venice

The Ranieri were a noble family of Perugia, owners of the papal fief of Civitella Ranieri, who governed with the title of counts (granted to Ruggero II Cane Ranieri in 1426 by Pope Martin V) until 1817, the year in which the ancient feudal county was absorbed by the Church State and finally became part of the municipality of Umbertide (PG).

== History ==
The first information about the family dates back to the 10th century and is connected to Uberto (or Umberto) although nothing has been confirmed about him. Some studies say he is of Saxon origin, others say he is the son of Raniero, brother of Guglielmo, Marquis of Monferrato. His son, Ugo, together with his brothers Benedetto, Inghilberto and Urso, was granted the fief of La Fratta (the old name of today's town of Umbertide) by the Emperor Otto III. His grandson, Ranieri, officially created the lineage of the Ranieri, and began to construct the "cittadella", which gave rise to the name of Civitella, currently known as Civitella Ranieri, the centre of a feudal territory stretching from Umbertide to the area around Gubbio, subjugated to the city of Perugia towards the end of the 12th century.

Between the 12th and 13th century, the original lineage divided into four branches: in addition to the Ranieri of Civitella, the branches of Gubbio, Orvieto and Ragusa in Dalmatia (which later moved to Venice) were created. The latter three branches did not, however, survive to modern times, unlike the Ranieri family of Civitella (or of Perugia).

As a result of the strategic importance of the fief of Civitella, thanks to its position, it was subjected to serious attempts to occupy it, one of which by Arlotto Michelotti of the Michelotti family of Perugia drove the family out in 1360. The fief was then handed over to the Raspanti faction, and was finally re-captured by Ruggero Cane of the Ranieri family, leader of mercenaries, only in 1407. Costantino II (1427-1460), Ruggero Cane's eldest son, also acquired the feudal county of Schifanoia which he gave in his will, written in 1483, to his second born son, Bernardino, (from whose lineage it was passed down to the Della Penna family in 1624), whereas he left the feudal county of Civitella to his eldest, Ruggero and his descendants (his son Raniero, followed by his grandson Ruggero). In 1612, Pope Paul V confirmed the privileges over the castle of Civitella and the title of counts to Costantino III, son of Ruggero IV and of Castora Della Staffa, and extended them to his descendants. Costantino's wife, Porzia Varani of the Dukes of Camerino, in agreement with her sister Olimpia, gifted the castle of Beldiletto to the Ranieri family and gave birth to her husband's sons Tancredi and Ruggero (+1646), Knight of Malta.

In 1610, Costantino II's firstborn, Tancredi (+ 1645), was an officer in Flanders for the Archduke of Austria, Matthias of Habsburg and, in 1623, became governor of Romagna. He married Eleonora Degli Oddi, who inherited the feudal county of Laviano from her father Tiberio, which she passed on to her firstborn son Costantino IV (1624-1679). Tancredi and Eleonora's other sons included Tiberio (born 1634), a Knight of Malta and Ruggero who, in 1678, bought back the fief of Montegualandro on the border between Umbria and Tuscany (today the municipality of Tuoro sul Trasimeno, PG) for the family, formerly owned by the Montemelini family, and bound it by a trust. His son Ippolito died in Germany in 1698, while serving as captain of the guards for the Savoy family.

Costantino IV known as “il Ferrarese” (1624-1679) was Lieutenant-General of the cavalry and governor of the papal armies in Ferrara, where he later died. He married Zenobia Signorelli di Rosciano, who gave him a son, Curzio (+1678), who married Costanza Oddi and had a son Costantino V (+ 1742). In 1697, the latter married Teresa Bigazzini, who gave birth to Curzio II (1707-1760), whose first wife was Flerida Olivieri and his second, Elena di Valvasone. Curzio was the father of Giovanni Antonio I (1732-1811), Glotto, Archdeacon, Raniero (+ 1805), Knight of Malta, and Rinaldo (1739-1819), also a Knight of Malta and chamberlain to the Duke of Modena.

Giovanni Antonio I married Francesca Gondi and the French took away the fief of Civitella from him in 1807. In 1815, his son Ruggero (1791-1863) was awarded the collection of the taxes by the Government. He also became Mayor of Civitella Ranieri and in 1847 he was appointed Colonel of the Civic Guard of Perugia. In 1818, following the fall of the Napoleonic Empire, the castle was united with the municipality of Umbertide and the counts Ranieri officially became subjects of the Pope. Ruggero and his wife Marianna Gavotti Verospi had a son, Giovanni Antonio II (1822-1893), who organised a model farm on the lands of the former fiefdom with the help of the farmer Pio Gori.

Mid 19th century, the Ranieri family united with the Bourbon di Sorbello family following the marriage of Giovanni Antonio and the Marquess Altavilla Bourbon di Sorbello (1836-1914), the last in her lineage. The King of Italy, Umberto I of Savoy granted permission to continue using the title of Bourbon di Sorbello together with that of Ranieri to create the dynastic lineage of the Ranieri Bourbon di Sorbello family. The first in line was the Marquis Ruggero VI Ranieri Bourbon di Sorbello (1864-1946) who, as the eldest child of Giovanni Antonio Ranieri and Altavilla Bourbon di Sorbello, took the surname and coat of arms of the Bourbon di Sorbello family from 1906, as provided for in the will of his grandfather on his mother's side, Marquis Carlo Emanuele Bourbon di Sorbello.

== Remarkable members ==
- Ruggero Cane Ranieri (+ 1441)

Military leader and soldier of fortune, son of Costantino I Ranieri. Ousted from his lands by the Michelotti family from Perugia, he won back the fortified castle of Civitella in 1407 and rebuilt it. He was a very skilled soldier, known for his contribution in the battle of Motta di Livenza (TV) and for being the ally of the great Italian military leader Braccio Fortebracci da Montone. In 1426, he was granted the title of count by Pope Martin V, on payment of 133 gold florins. The noble privilege was later reconfirmed by Pope Paul III (1544) and Paul V (1612).

- Costantino V Ranieri (1677-1742),

During the war of the Spanish Succession (1702-1714), he served in the Austrian army and took part in the siege and capture of the stronghold of Gaeta alongside the Field Marshall of the Austrian army Wirich Philipp von Daun. He was head valet for Pope Innocent XIII and Gentleman of the Bedchamber for Grand Duke of Tuscany. Known as "il viaggiatore" (the traveller), he left an account of a journey he had undertaken in northern Italy with his son Curzio and the latter's newly-wed wife, Countess Flerida Olivieri.

== Lineage of Counts Ranieri (Civitella branch) ==
- Uberto (... – ...)
- Ugo (... – ...) He was granted the fiefdom of La Fratta by the Emperor Otto III.
- Raniero I Ranieri (... – ...) Founder of the first fortified nucleus of the fief of Civitella.
- Ugo II (... – ...)
- Monaldo (... – ...)
- Glotto (... – ...) Podestà of Perugia in 1200
- Tancredi I (... – ...) Known as “il Bufa”
- Senso (... – ...)
- Tancredi II (... – ...) Married to Aloisia degli Oddi
- Ruggero I (... – ...)
- Costantino I (... – ...) Driven from Perugia by the Michelotti family, he lived in exile from 1361.
- Ruggero II Cane (ante 1407-1441) Married first to Marzia Colonna and then remarried to Altavilla Ubaldini. A famous military leader, he recaptured the fiefdom of Civitella in 1467 and began its reconstruction.
- Costantino II (1427-1460) Married to Pantasilea Farnese
- Ruggero III (+1490) Married to Isabella Graziani
- Raniero II (1487-1548)Married to Teodorina Baglioni. In 1495, he recaptured Civitella, after it had been sacked and occupied by the Baglioni family in 1491 and completed its reconstruction in 1519.
- Ruggero IV (1516-1559) Married to Castora della Staffa
- Costantino III (+1615) Married to Porzia Varano dei duchi di Camerino
- Tancredi III (+1645) Married to Eleonora degli Oddi. He took part in the siege of Ostend and became governor of Romagna.
- Costantino IV (1624-1679) Married to Zenobia Signorelli. Known as "il Ferrarese", he was appointed castellan of the city of Ferrara, where he is buried.
- Costantino V (1677-1742) Married to Costanza Oddi di Antognolla
- Curzio (1709-1760) Married to Teresa Bigazzini. He purchased the fiefdom of Montegualandro from his great uncle Ruggero. He was governor of Mantua.
- Giovanni Antonio I (1732-1811) Married to Francesca Gondi and Ricarda dei Ranieri
- Ruggero V (1791-1863) Married to Marianna Gavotti. The last governor of the feudal county of Civitella, held until 1817.
- Giovanni Antonio (1822-1892) Married to Altavilla Bourbon di Sorbello,

== See also ==
- Ruggero Cane Ranieri
