= Potter Puppet Pals =

Parody web series

- The sign showing the Potter Puppet Pals logo that appears at the start of most episodes.
- Also known as: PPP
- Genre: Comedy, puppetry, variety, parody
- Created by: Neil Cicierega, Emmy Cicierega, Alora Lanzillotta
- Voices of: Neil Cicierega
- Country of origin: United States
- Original language: English

Original release
- Network: Newgrounds
- Release: September 27 – December 15, 2003
- Network: YouTube
- Release: September 26, 2006 – present

Potter Puppet Pals is a puppet show web series parodying the Harry Potter book and film series by J. K. Rowling, created by Neil Cicierega. The series was initially posted on Newgrounds, and featured Flash animated characters, but it eventually began being uploaded to YouTube, with real-life puppetry. The YouTube videos were initially posted on Cicierega's personal channel, then moved to a channel called "Potter Puppet Pals", exclusively made for the purpose of uploading the series.

== Characters ==
Much of the humor derived from the series originates from Cicierega's unique interpretation of the principal Harry Potter characters. Some characters are given personalities designed to contrast completely with their attitudes in the Harry Potter books and films. Cicierega's Harry is portrayed as an extremely brash, arrogant, and vain teenager who is "rife with boyish attitude", while Dumbledore is a nudist, and Ron is depicted as a kind naive boy who is frequently taken advantage of by Harry. Other times, an aspect of the original stories is blown out of proportion for comedic effect, such as Hermione Granger's love of reading and matter-of-fact approach to problems. Some characters are depicted in humorous ways, such as Neville Longbottom (a butternut squash on a stick with a crudely drawn face) and Cedric Diggory (a foot with the face of Robert Pattinson, the actor who portrayed him in the fourth Harry Potter film, drawn on the sole).

Throughout the course of the series, multiple characters are seemingly killed off, such as Neville in "Neville's Birthday" when Harry explodes him with the power of words, and Voldemort in "Harryween" when Ron Weasley, dressed as a unicorn, stabs Voldemort in the stomach with his horn; neither have made appearances since.

== The Mysterious Ticking Noise ==
"The Mysterious Ticking Noise", released March 23, 2007, was the 22nd most-viewed video on YouTube as of January 1, 2013, with over 137.5 million views.The video was nominated and won in the Comedy category in the 2008 YouTube Awards with 61.6% of the votes in that category.

In the video, Severus Snape hears a strange ticking and, noticing it has a catchy rhythm, begins singing his name to it, followed by Albus Dumbledore, Ron Weasley, Hermione Granger, and Harry Potter. Towards the end, Ron discovers that the source of the ticking is a pipe bomb that explodes as Harry and Hermione celebrate, letting Lord Voldemort sing his name by himself to the tune of "Lollipop". At the New York premiere of Harry Potter and the Deathly Hallows – Part 2, Alan Rickman was interviewed by MTV and quoted as saying "[Potter Puppet Pals] is very beautifully done, that little piece of work. Can you get rich from that? I hope they did." Daniel Radcliffe suggested in an interview by MTV that the cast of the Harry Potter film series should do a live-action version of "The Mysterious Ticking Noise" for a charity. On 23 March 2017, a 4K remake of the original video was posted to the Potter Puppet Pals channel to mark the 10th anniversary of the original.
