= Mouth Silence =

Mixtape by Neil Cicierega
- Released: July 19, 2014
- Genre: Mashup; remix
- Length: 55:48

Neil Cicierega chronology
Mouth Sounds (2014)	Mouth Silence (2014)	Spirit Phone (as Lemon Demon) (2016)

Mouth Silence is the second mashup mixtape by American musician and comedian Neil Cicierega. Following the format of his previous release, Mouth Sounds, the mixtape is composed of mashups and remixes of popular songs from the 1980s, 1990s and 2000s.

Unlike Mouth Sounds, which used the song "All Star" by Smash Mouth as a recurring element, Mouth Silence relegates said song to Easter eggs.

A third installment, Mouth Moods, was released in 2017, and a fourth installment, Mouth Dreams, in 2020.

Although Mouth Silence is the second mixtape released in the series, according to Cicierega, it is a prequel to Mouth Sounds. It is, jokingly, also considered a "squeakquel" to Mouth Moods and a "shriekquel" to Mouth Dreams.

Several tracks feature original instrumental work by Cicierega, and the instrumental to "Space Monkey Mafia" is entirely original.

== Reception ==
Much like its predecessor, Mouth Sounds, critics remarked on the mixtape's simultaneous appeal to and perversion of the listener's nostalgia, with Katie Rife of The A.V. Club describing it as "laugh out loud horrifying" and Ryan Manning of The Verge promising that listeners would "have a strong reaction, negative, positive, horrified, glorified". Sasha Geffen, writing for Impose Magazine, describes the effect as "total context collapse", calling it "paradoxically [...] comforting".

== Track listing ==
No.	Title	Length
1.	"Goodbye"	2:17
2.	"Rollercloser"	3:25
3.	"Furries"	2:20
4.	"Friends"	0:10
5.	"Best"	3:53
6.	"Pokémon"	3:17
7.	"Sexual Lion King"	3:52
8.	"Crocodile Chop"	3:42
9.	"Transmission"	0:54
10.	"Love Psych"	3:54
11.	"Orgonon Gurlz"	4:19
12.	"Born to Cat"	0:43
13.	"What Is It"	3:04
14.	"It's"	1:09
15.	"Close to the Sun"	1:24
16.	"Numbers"	5:07
17.	"Space Monkey Mafia"	3:48
18.	"Wndrwll"	3:28
19.	"Piss"	4:58
Total length:		55:48
