= Mouth Dreams =

Mixtape by Neil Cicierega
- Released: September 30, 2020
- Recorded: 2019–2020
- Genre: Mashup; remix
- Length: 1:01:07

Neil Cicierega chronology
Mouth Moods (2017)	Mouth Dreams (2020)

Mouth Dreams is the fourth mashup mixtape by American musician and comedian Neil Cicierega. It was released on September 30, 2020. Like his three previous mashup mixtapes (Mouth Sounds, Mouth Silence, and Mouth Moods), its source material is primarily Top 40 hits from the late 20th and early 21st centuries, with Mouth Dreams emphasizing on songs about sleeping and dreams. It marks the musician's first major release since 2017.

== Background ==
Like his previous mashup mixtapes Mouth Sounds, Mouth Silence, and Mouth Moods, its source material is primarily Top 40 hits from the late 20th and early 21st centuries; he also sampled classical music from the 19th century ("Brithoven" and "Ain't").

=== Hidden messages ===
When downloaded from Cicierega's website, a secret message is hidden in the track info for Mouth Dreams. Each track contains a one-letter comment; when the tracks are arranged in reverse alphabetical order by title, the comments spell "I can't think of a secret message". The mixtape's cover art contains several hidden references. The title and Cicierega's name feature sparkles, spelling out "NiCe MoDems" when isolated, referencing the mixtape's conclusion of a dial-up modem. A Wingding character is within each of Cicierega's pupils, representing the English letters "M" and "D" (referring to the mixtape's title Mouth Dreams). Ewoks are reflected in Cicierega's glasses, referencing the track "Limp Wicket" featuring samples from Meco's "Ewok Celebration".

== Reception ==
Critical reception of Mouth Dreams was positive. Joseph Earp of Junkee called it Cicierega's "new masterpiece", "his wildest work yet" and "heinous and beautiful in the same measure". The A.V. Club praised it as "so stupid, and so good".

== Track listing ==
Featured works sourced from synonymous listings by Stereogum, MEAWW, and the A.V. Club.

No.	Title	Featured works	Length
1.	"Yahoo"	Wylie Gustafson's 1999 Yahoo! jingle; Original instrumentation by Cicierega	2:13
2.	"Mouth Dreams (Intro)"	Opening theme and Rod Serling's narration from The Twilight Zone	0:52
3.	"Spongerock"	Queen's "We Will Rock You"; SpongeBob SquarePants theme and end credits	2:15
4.	"Just a Baby"	Hoobastank's "The Reason"; Johnny Cash's "Folsom Prison Blues"; Justin Bieber's "Baby"	3:48
5.	"Superkiller"	Talking Heads' "Psycho Killer"; Rick James' "Super Freak"	2:26
6.	"Get Happy"	That's My Ronald - "Eggs-actly What's Inside"; The Partridge Family's "C'mon, Get Happy"; Additional instrumentation by Cicierega	3:50
7.	"Ribs"	Chili's "Baby Back Ribs" jingle; Tears for Fears' "Everybody Wants to Rule the World"; Marilyn Manson's "The Beautiful People"; The Tokens' "The Lion Sleeps Tonight"	3:50
8.	"My Mouth"	Aerosmith's "Dream On"; Green Day's "Brain Stew"	2:32
9.	"Aerolong"	Foo Fighters' "Everlong"; Aerosmith's "I Don't Want to Miss a Thing"	1:25
10.	"Sleepin'"	Lit's "My Own Worst Enemy"	1:15
11.	"Aammoorree"	Dean Martin's "That's Amore"	2:15
12.	"Where Is My Mom"	The Pixies' "Where Is My Mind?"; Fountains of Wayne's "Stacy's Mom"	2:15
13.	"Fredhammer"	Peter Gabriel's "Sledgehammer"; Limp Bizkit's "Nookie"; Jonathan Wolff's Seinfeld theme; Mario saying "Tanooki!" in Mario Kart 8	2:57
14.	"Limp Wicket"	Limp Bizkit's "Nookie"; Meco's "Ewok Celebration"	2:25
15.	"Cannibals"	1985 DiC production bumper; 1985 Worldvision Home Video production bumper; 1976 & 1986 Viacom production bumpers; 1971 PBS production bumper; WGBH-TV production bumper; James A. Moorer's THX "Deep Note"; Fine Young Cannibals' "She Drives Me Crazy"; 1982 United Artists production bumper; 1979 TAT Communications Company production bumper; A Current Affair "ka-chung" sound effect; Westinghouse Broadcasting bumper; 1992 Genesis Entertainment bumper; 1991 Disney "Feature Presentation" bumper (voice-over by Mark Elliot); Additional instrumentation by Cicierega	4:29
16.	"The Outsiders"	Found audio from various commercials and movie trailers narrated by Don LaFontaine for E.T.: The Extra-Terrestrial (1982), Bumble Bee tuna, Inspector Gadget (1999), Payless Shoes, Teenage Mutant Ninja Turtles III (1993), Free Willy (1993) & Kid Cuisine; Several variations of Carmine Coppola's "Fate Theme" (from the 1983 film version of The Outsiders), including "Rumble Variation / Dallas' Death"	1:13
17.	"Johnny"	Johnny Cash's "Hurt" (originally by Nine Inch Nails); Rick Astley's "Never Gonna Give You Up"	1:29
18.	"Closerflies"	Nine Inch Nails' "Closer"; Owl City's "Fireflies"	3:34
19.	"Nightmovin'"	Avenged Sevenfold's "Nightmare"; Billy Joel's "Movin' Out (Anthony's Song)"	1:25
20.	"Whitehouse"	Raymond Scott's "Powerhouse" (jazz arrangement as heard on multiple Looney Tunes shorts, and synthesizer arrangement by Cicierega); The White Stripes' "Fell in Love with a Girl"	1:54
21.	"Wah"	Edwin Starr's "War"; Spice Girls' "Wannabe"; Disturbed's "Down with the Sickness"; Clips of Wario laughing	0:55
22.	"Pee Wee Inc"	Danny Elfman's "Breakfast Machine" (from Pee-wee's Big Adventure); Gorillaz' "Feel Good Inc."; Clip of Pee-wee Herman laughing	2:36
23.	"10,000 Spoons"	Alanis Morissette's "Ironic"; Stu Phillips' Knight Rider theme; Black Sabbath's "Iron Man"	3:23
24.	"Mouth Dreams (Extro)"	Sounds which, when analyzed in a spectrogram, spell out "DO NOT TRUST SHREK" backwards and in Wingdings; Backstreet Boys' "Drowning"; Smash Mouth's "All Star"; System of a Down's "Chop Suey!"	1:44
25.	"Brithoven"	Ludwig van Beethoven's "Symphony No. 5"; Britney Spears' "...Baby One More Time"	1:07
26.	"Ain't"	Edvard Grieg's "In the Hall of the Mountain King"; Weezer's "Say It Ain't So"; Clip of Banjo snoring from Banjo-Kazooie; Clip of a dial-up modem	2:50
Total length:			1:01:07
