= Y. P. Varshni =

Canadian-Indian astronomer (born 1932)

Yatendra Pal Varshni (born 21 May 1932) is a Canadian-Indian scientist in the areas of physics and astrophysics.

== Early life and education ==
Varshni studied at Allahabad University, where he obtained his B.Sc in 1950, his M.Sc in 1952, and his Ph.D in 1956. He published his first research paper in 1951 at the age of 19. He served as an assistant professor in the Physics Department of Allahabad University from 1955 to 1960.

== Career ==
Varshni emigrated to Canada as a postdoctoral fellow at the National Research Council, Ottawa, Canada in July 1960, where he worked in theoretical physics under Ta-You Wu for two years. In July 1962, he was appointed as assistant professor in the Department of Physics at the University of Ottawa. He became associate professor in July 1965 and professor in July 1969. He retired in June 1997 and was then appointed as emeritus professor.

Varshni worked in several areas of physics and astrophysics. He proposed a semi-empirical relation for the temperature dependence of the energy gap in semiconductors which became known as the Varshni Equation. He developed the laser star model of quasars, which was not accepted by the astronomical community. He published more than 260 research papers in peer-reviewed scientific journals, and contributed three biographies to the Biographical Encyclopedia of Astronomers. Varshni was the Ph.D. advisor of David Joseph Singh.

== Honours ==
Varshni was made a Fellow of the American Physical Society, Institute of Physics (UK) and Royal Astronomical Society (UK). He was also a member of the American Astronomical Society and the Astronomical Society of India.
