= Bustin (song) =

2015 single by Neil Cicierega

Single by Neil Cicierega

from the album Mouth Moods
- Released: March 31, 2015
- Recorded: 2015
- Genre: Mashup; Parody song; Remix
- Length: 3:57 (single version); 3:47 (album version)

Neil Cicierega singles chronology
"I Can't Enter That (No Sandman)" (2015)	"Bustin" (2015)	"Dear Dinosaur" (2015)

Music video
- "Bustin" on YouTube

"Bustin" is a song by American musician and comedian Neil Cicierega. It was released on March 31, 2015, as the lead single for his third mashup album Mouth Moods. "Bustin" would become a viral meme and was praised by OC Weekly.

== Background ==
"Bustin" remixes Ray Parker Jr.'s "Ghostbusters", heavily relying on the lyric "bustin' makes me feel good" and repeatedly editing it into various sexual innuendos and references to sleeping. The final time "feel good" is sung, a sample of Gorillaz's "Feel Good Inc." is used in place of Parker's vocals. "Bustin's" melody is additionally altered and often uses the lyric "yeah yeah yeah" to create a backing vocal hook. "Bustin" was later included on Cicierega's third mashup album Mouth Moods, and is downloadable for free on Cicierega's website.

== Music video ==
Alongside the single's release on SoundCloud, a music video heavily editing footage of several performances of "Ghostbusters" and the song's accompanying movie was released on March 31, 2015.

== Reception ==
"Bustin" became a viral meme. OC Weekly praised it among others, describing it as "absolutely brilliant how an entirely new track can be created from the original elements while still containing its fun vibe".
