= Biordo Michelotti =

Italian condottiero (1352–1398)

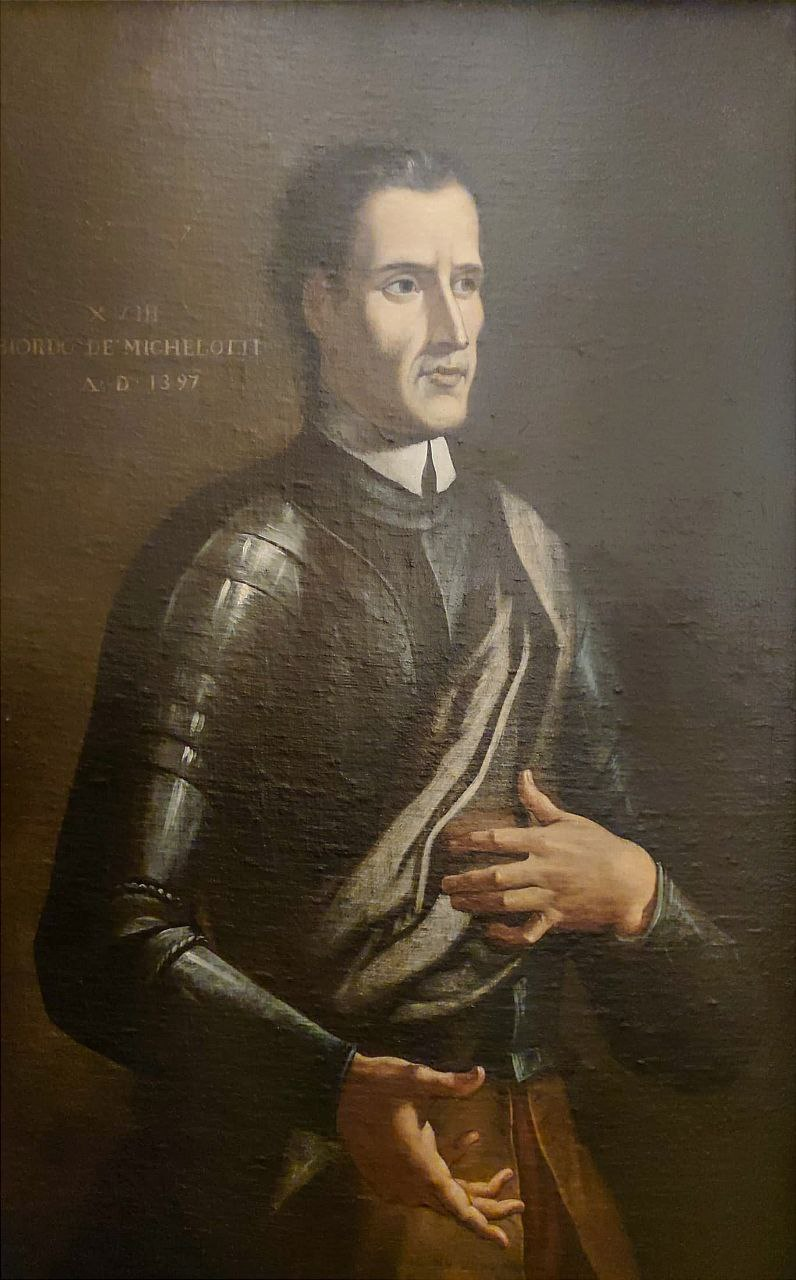
Portrait of Biordo Michelotti by Francesco Busti, 1731

Biordo Michelotti (1352 – 10 March 1398) was an Italian condottiero, who was lord of Perugia and commander-in-chief of the Republic of Florence.

Born in Perugia, he was a pupil of Alberico da Barbiano. He fought for the Visconti of Milan and later become capitano generale of Florence.

In 1392 numerous minor fiefs in the Perugine territory, including Assisi, Nocera, Orvieto, Deruta and Todi, fearing to lose their independence as part of the Papal States, gave themselves to Michelotti in exchange of military protection.

The following year turmoils in Perugia brought power to the Ruspanti ("Rough") party against the Beccherini, who were of noble origin. The latter were exiled while a commission of 25 asked Michelotti to lead the new government. He therefore became Signore of the city.

Five years later, however, Michelotti was assassinated in his residence by killers sent by Francesco Guidalotti, Abbot of San Pietro. The Seigniory, whose influence had quickly extended to much of what is now Umbria region, disappeared.

Biordo's younger brother, Ceccolino, returned in Perugia together with Biordo's followers in the aftermath of the city's passage under Gian Galeazzo Visconti in 1400. He was however killed by the famous condottiero Braccio da Montone, who had been exiled by Biordo.
