= Mouth Moods =

Mixtape by Neil Cicierega
- Released: January 23, 2017
- Recorded: 2015–2016
- Genre: Mashup; Plunderphonics; remix
- Length: 56:53

Neil Cicierega chronology
Spirit Phone (2016)	Mouth Moods (2017)	Mouth Dreams (2020)

Singles from Mouth Moods
- 1. "Bustin" Released: March 31, 2015

Mouth Moods is the third mashup mixtape by American musician and comedian Neil Cicierega released in 2017. Like his previous mashup mixtapes Mouth Sounds and Mouth Silence, its source material is primarily Top 40 hits from the late 20th and early 21st centuries. Samples from Smash Mouth's "All Star" return, after being absent outside of Easter eggs in Mouth Silence. A fourth installment to the Mouth series, Mouth Dreams, was released in 2020.

== Reception ==
Mouth Moods was praised for being "just as compelling" as its predecessors, as well as for its usage of various songs in pop culture history, as well as its "enhanced orchestral scope" over the previous two mixtapes.

The mixtape includes the innuendo-filled track "Bustin", based on the Ray Parker Jr. song "Ghostbusters", which became a viral hit. The publication OC Weekly stated that it was "[a]bsolutely brilliant how an entirely new track can be created from the original elements while still containing its fun vibe."

== Track listing ==
No.	Title	Length
1.	"The Starting Line"	2:54
2.	"Floor Corn"	2:29
3.	"AC/VC"	2:58
4.	"300MB"	2:11
5.	"Revolution #5"	0:28
6.	"Dear Dinosaur"	3:39
7.	"Annoyed Grunt"	3:31
8.	"Bustin"	3:47
9.	"Blockbuster"	0:14
10.	"Busta"	1:07
11.	"Tiger"	3:03
12.	"The End"	3:32
13.	"Shady Interlude"	0:57
14.	"T.I.M.E."	4:37
15.	"Smooth"	4:17
16.	"Stand by Meme"	2:24
17.	"Wallspin"	3:15
18.	"Wow Wow"	3:29
19.	"Mouth Pressure"	3:43
20.	"Shit"	4:08
Total length:		56:53
