= Giovanni Fontana =

Giovanni Fontana may refer to:

- Giovanni Fontana (engineer) (c. 1395–c. 1455), Venetian physician and engineer who portrayed himself as a magus
- Giovanni Fontana (architect) (1540–1614), Dominican friar and late-Mannerist architect, brother of Domenico Fontana
- Giovanni Fontana (bishop of Ferrara) (1537–1611), Roman Catholic bishop
- Giovanni Fontana (bishop of Cesena) (1697–1716), Roman Catholic bishop
- Giovanni Battista Fontana (painter) (1524–1587), Italian painter and engraver
- Giovanni Battista Fontana (composer) (c. 1571–1630), Italian Baroque composer and violinist
- Giovanni Maria Fontana (c. 1670–after 1712), Italian-Swiss architect who worked in Russia
- Giovanni Fontana (sculptor) (1821–1893), Italian-born sculptor, based in London
- Giovanni Fontana (poet) (born 1946), Italian poet and publisher
