= Rocca of Umbertide =

- Umbertide, Italy
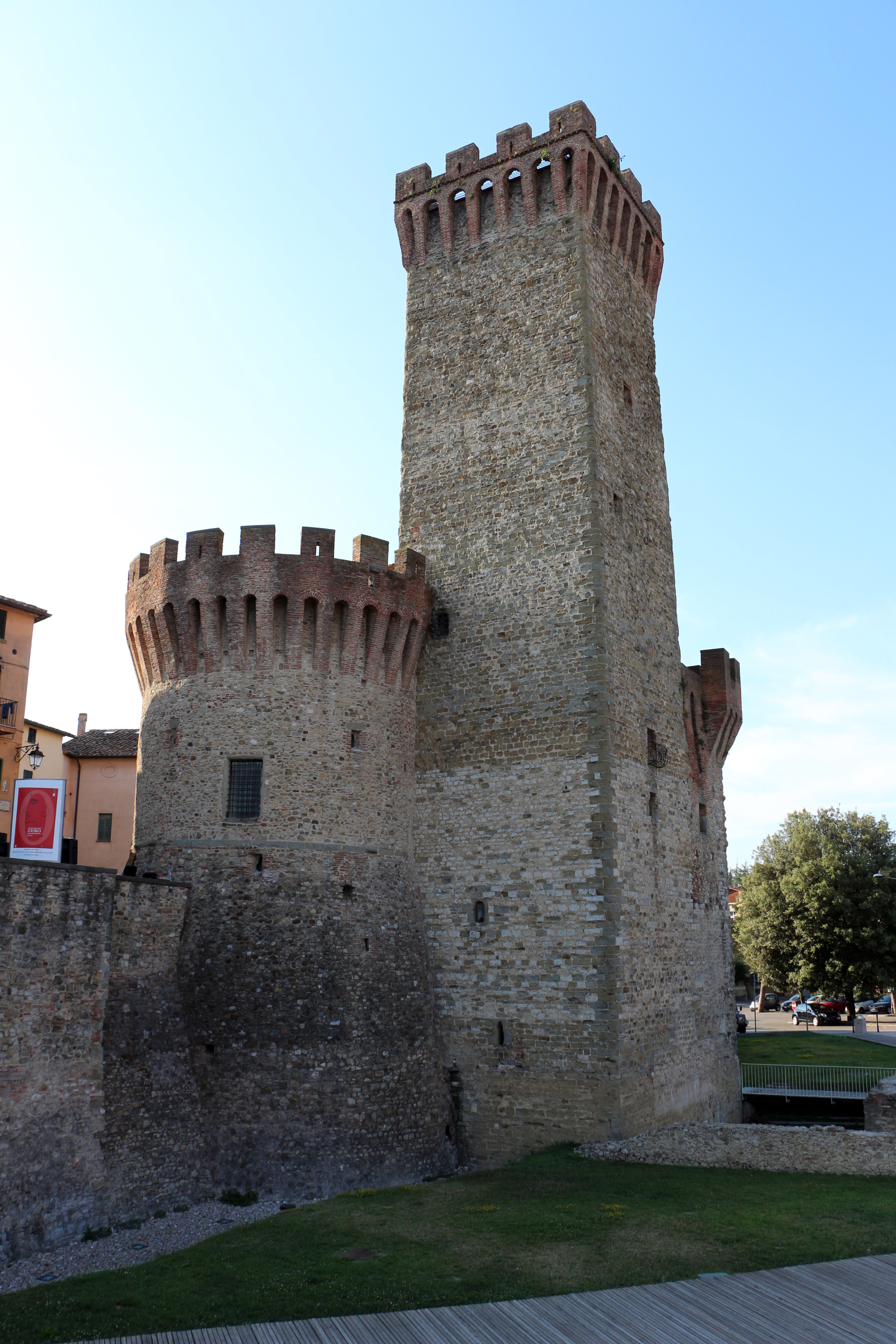

Site information
- Condition: Restored

Location
- Coordinates: 43°18′24.5″N 12°19′40.7″E

Site history
- Built: 1374-1389

The Rocca of Umbertide is a 14th-century castle located in the center of the town of Umbertide, province of Perugia, region of Umbria, Italy. It is the town's symbol.

== History ==
Construction of the castle began in 1374, with designs by Angeluccio di Ceccolo, and construction directed by Alberto Guidalotti, with completion in 1389. It has a tower of nearly 32 meters in height with walls that are 2 meters thick at the base. Two corner towers are linked to a square central bulwark. Today, the castle has a single door towards the town, but at one time, it had an opening across the adjacent river.

In 1394, Braccio Fortebraccio of Montone was held prisoner here. Released after the payment of a ransom, he then conquered the castle and used it as a personal residence until his death in 1424. In the following years the castle was under the rule of the State of the Church; in 1478 the structure, together with the surrounding territories, was devastated by the troops of Federico da Montefeltro.

In 1521 Pope Leo X entrusted the custody of the castle to the town's higher authorities for seven years; such honor was then renewed for another ten years by Pope Clement VII. The fortress saw its importance grow significantly in the 16th century, when it became the seat of a papal military garrison.

After the restoration of Papal authority in 1814, the castle was used a prison until 1923. It was then used as a residential building until 1974. It subsequently became property of the comune, and during the late 1980s underwent restoration to its historical identity as a castle. One exception was the creation of a new entrance. Starting in 1986, the castle became used for contemporary art exhibits. It now also displays a collection of donated works by Giovanni Ciangottini.
