= Debra Bustin =

New Zealand artist

Debra Kaye Bustin (born 1957) is a New Zealand artist. Her work is in the permanent collections of Auckland Art Gallery Toi o Tāmaki, Museum of New Zealand Te Papa Tongarewa, the Sarjeant Gallery and the Govett-Brewster Art Gallery.

Bustin was born in Wellington in 1957. Her art is characterised by bright colours and plastic materials, often covering whole walls and floors of a space.

In 2010, Bustin worked with children living in Wellington City Council's Te Ara Hou housing estate to redesign the area's playground as part of a major redevelopment of the neighbourhood. She has also designed public outdoor sculptural art for the Paraparaumu Library.
