= Francesco Busti =

Italian painter

Francesco Busti (1678–1767) was an Italian painter of the late-Baroque and Neoclassical periods.

== Biography ==
He was born in Perugia, Papal States. He was putatively a pupil of Giovanni Battista Gaulli. One of his pupils was Nicola Giuli and Baldassare Orsini, who later became an art historian. He painted an altarpiece of St Vincent Ferrer of the church of San Domenico in Perugia.
