= Not a Trampoline =

2014 album by Rob Cantor

Studio album by Rob Cantor
- Released: April 14, 2014
- Recorded: August 2012 – Late 2013
- Studios: Elysian Masters (Los Angeles); Laboratory (Los Angeles); Kingsize Soundlabs (Los Angeles)
- Genres: Alternative rock; electropop; dance-pop
- Length: 41:39
- Producer: Gregtronic

Rob Cantor chronology
Not a Trampoline (2014)	Age of Athleisure (2026)

Singles from Not a Trampoline
- 1. "Old Bike" Released: March 4, 2014; 2. "Ghost" Released: March 19, 2014; 3. "All I Need Is You" Released: April 9, 2014

Not a Trampoline is the solo debut studio album by American musician Rob Cantor, released independently on April 14, 2014. It follows an alternative rock style with elements of electropop and dance-pop. Produced by Gregtronic, the album originated from a period of exploratory writing without a rigid concept. Former Tally Hall bandmates and peers collaborated on the project, including the featured artists Madi Diaz and Jhameel. Three singles were released in anticipation of the album: "Old Bike", "Ghost", and "All I Need Is You".

Upon release, the album earned generally positive reviews. Critics praised its stylistic variety, songwriting, and upbeat production. The song "Perfect" went viral after Cantor produced a video with Tally Hall keyboardist Andrew Horowitz featuring 29 celebrity impressions, with a later reveal that the impressions were lip-synced within a carefully edited production. Not a Trampoline received physical vinyl and CD editions alongside a deluxe release on November 14, 2025.

== Background and production ==
In December 2002, Rob Cantor formed the band Tally Hall with Andrew Horowitz and Zubin Sedghi. Later recruiting Joe Hawley and Ross Federman, the band released two albums: Marvin's Marvelous Mechanical Museum (2005) and Good & Evil (2011). Tally Hall went on hiatus following the latter, leading Cantor to begin producing solo work. In 2012, he released the singles "Christian Bale Is at Your Party" and "Shia LaBeouf", with both becoming viral videos. Cantor began writing demos without a collective vision, aiming for the album's variety to prevent monotony. Songs were composed before their lyrics were developed, although at other times, they began with the lyrics. He was influenced by Hawley's writing style with Tally Hall to create plot-focused songs. "All I Need Is You" was the first song written for the album, expanded from an unused pitch for a Time Warner commercial. Cantor and producer Gregtronic were both inspired by Elton John's song "Levon" to incorporate a powerful string arrangement. "Old Bike" followed as the second song written.

Cantor shared an unfinished version of the track "La Telenovela" with Jhameel, who completed its chorus and transformed it into a duet. In 2012, Cantor reunited with Horowitz in Los Angeles, spending six hours together writing the song "Perfect". The two additionally collaborated on "The Rendezvous" with Madi Diaz, a track that was originally scrapped until further production was applied. Federman contributed drums to the song "Old Bike", while all four of Cantor's ex-bandmates gave feedback during the album's development. "I'm Gonna Win" is a reworked version of a Tally Hall demo written by Hawley. The revival of the demo came from Hawley's inclusion of Cantor's song "Time Machine" on the album Hawaii: Part II, sparking a song exchange. He initially had concerns regarding how the songs would flow together, but producer Gregtronic resolved this issue. For the project, Cantor has cited the Beatles, the Beach Boys, Queen, Elliott Smith, Paul Simon, and Dan Wilson as influences. The track "Lightshine" was later reconstructed from an old demo by Cantor into a drastically different song, only retaining its chorus, though it was scrapped from the album's initial issue.

== Release ==
On March 4, 2014, Rob Cantor announced Not a Trampoline as his solo debut album, alongside releasing "Old Bike" as its lead single with a music video. "Ghost" followed as the second single on March 19, and "All I Need Is You" with a video as the third single on April 9. The album was independently released on April 14, 2014. These videos were independently made on a low budget, primarily utilizing help from friends and volunteers. Cantor worked alongside other directors to organize the productions, focusing on entertainment value. A music video for "The Rendezvous" was released on September 9, depicting an old woman and a young man at a party becoming sexually involved and adventuring through the city before her suicide by drug overdose. Originally pitched as a comedic concept, the final production was portrayed in a dark tone. Following its release, featured artist Madi Diaz requested to be removed from the video's credits.

On July 1, 2014, Cantor released a video performance with Horowitz of "Perfect" while doing 29 celebrity impressions. It received wide press coverage as a viral video, amassing 6.5 million views on YouTube in its first week. When inquired by Today about its spread, Cantor stated "I'm so glad people enjoy the clip, and I'm even happier they seem to dig the song!" He then published a behind-the-scenes video on July 9, revealing that the impressions were lip synced with home movie editing designed to make it seem real. Stephen Peltzer of Westchester Productions, Cantor's representative, described it as "a carefully orchestrated effort", aiming to promote the album. On October 30, 2025, Cantor announced a physical issue of Not a Trampoline on CD and three vinyl variants, which were released on November 14. The edition features "Lightshine", re-recorded drumming by Federman, and new mixing by Gregtronic. Federman recorded the album's drums in late June 2025 alongside Cantor's second solo studio album, Age of Athleisure (2026).

== Reception ==
Not a Trampoline ratings
Review scores
Source	Rating
AudioPhix	7/10
Daily Vault	B+
Powerpopaholic	8/10

Not a Trampoline received generally positive reviews upon release. Aaron Kupferberg of Powerpopaholic gave the album an 8 out of 10, complimenting its varied genres and usage of harmonies and guitar riffs. Jeff Clutterbuck of Daily Vault rated the album a B+, praising its brevity as good idea utilization. He additionally accentuated the album's packaging and Cantor's vocal range awareness as contributing to its enjoyability, comparing various tracks to works by Weezer, ELO, the Cars, and Ben Folds Five. A BMI spotlight of Not a Trampoline likened its style to Cantor's work with Tally Hall, calling attention to the album's "smart songwriting and infectious, poppy beats". Albert Lunn of The Celebrity Cafe lauded the multitude of vocal collaborators bringing diverse sounds, singling out the production of "Old Bike" and its theme of companionship as encompassing the album. Within a week of its release, Bandcamp's staff noted the album as its weekly pick, describing it as "meticulously arranged pop music filled with gorgeous harmonies and irony-free optimism". Gerald Dih of AudioPhix scored the album a 7 out of 10, criticizing the first few songs as "not having any brilliance" but commended the songwriting and production of the rest, highlighting "I'm Gonna Win" for its contrasting instrumentation. The track is the most-streamed song from Not a Trampoline, accumulating over 25 million plays across streaming services by 2025.

== Track listing ==
All tracks are written by Rob Cantor, except where noted.

Not a Trampoline track listing
No.	Title	Writer(s)	Length
1.	"Ghost"	Cantor; Gregtronic	4:08
2.	"Old Bike"		3:07
3.	"Garden of Eden"	Cantor; Gregtronic	3:23
4.	"The Rendezvous" (featuring Madi Diaz)		3:37
5.	"I'm Gonna Win"	Cantor; Joe Hawley	2:38
6.	"All I Need Is You"	Cantor; Gregtronic	3:18
7.	"Lightshine"	Cantor; Gregtronic	5:04
8.	"Flamingo"		3:16
9.	"La Telenovela" (featuring Jhameel)	Cantor; Jhameel; Gregtronic	2:55
10.	"In Memoriam"		1:11
11.	"Let Your Mother Know"	Cantor; Gregtronic	3:08
12.	"Perfect"	Cantor; Andrew Horowitz	3:21
13.	"Lonely (But Not Alone)"		2:29
Total length:			41:39

== Personnel ==
Musicians

- Rob Cantor – vocals (all tracks), guitar (1–9, 11, 13), ukulele, whistling (12)
- Gregtronic – keyboards (1–9, 11), additional vocals (2, 6, 8, 10), orchestral arrangement (5, 6), additional programming (7)
- Ross Federman – drums (1–9, 11, 12), additional programming (2)
- Jacob Bartfield – bass (1–3, 5–9, 11)
- Bora Karaca – guitar (1, 11), whistling (12)
- The Zabeth Russell Children's Chorus – additional vocals (1)
- Alia Marie – gospel vocals (2, 10)
- Madi Diaz – vocals (4)
- Andrew Horowitz – keyboards, production (4, 12), whistling (12)
- Andrew Laurich – additional vocals (8)
- Charlotte Lee – additional vocals (8)
- Jhameel – vocals (9)
- Carlos Tequila – trumpet (9)
- Merrick McGeorge – harp (10)
- Cyndi Lynott – horn (10)
- Greg Nicolett – orchestral arrangement (10)
- Chase Deso – guitar programming (11)

Technical

- Rob Cantor – art direction
- Gregtronic – production, mixing engineer
- Bora Karaca – engineer, art direction
- Dave Cooley – mastering engineer
- Cameron Lister – additional engineering
- Nick DuPlessis – packaging layout, photography
- Diana King – photography
- Greg Kessler – photography
- Cyndi Lynott – management
- Erik Selz – booking
