= Melissa Villaseñor =

American comedian and actress (born 1987)

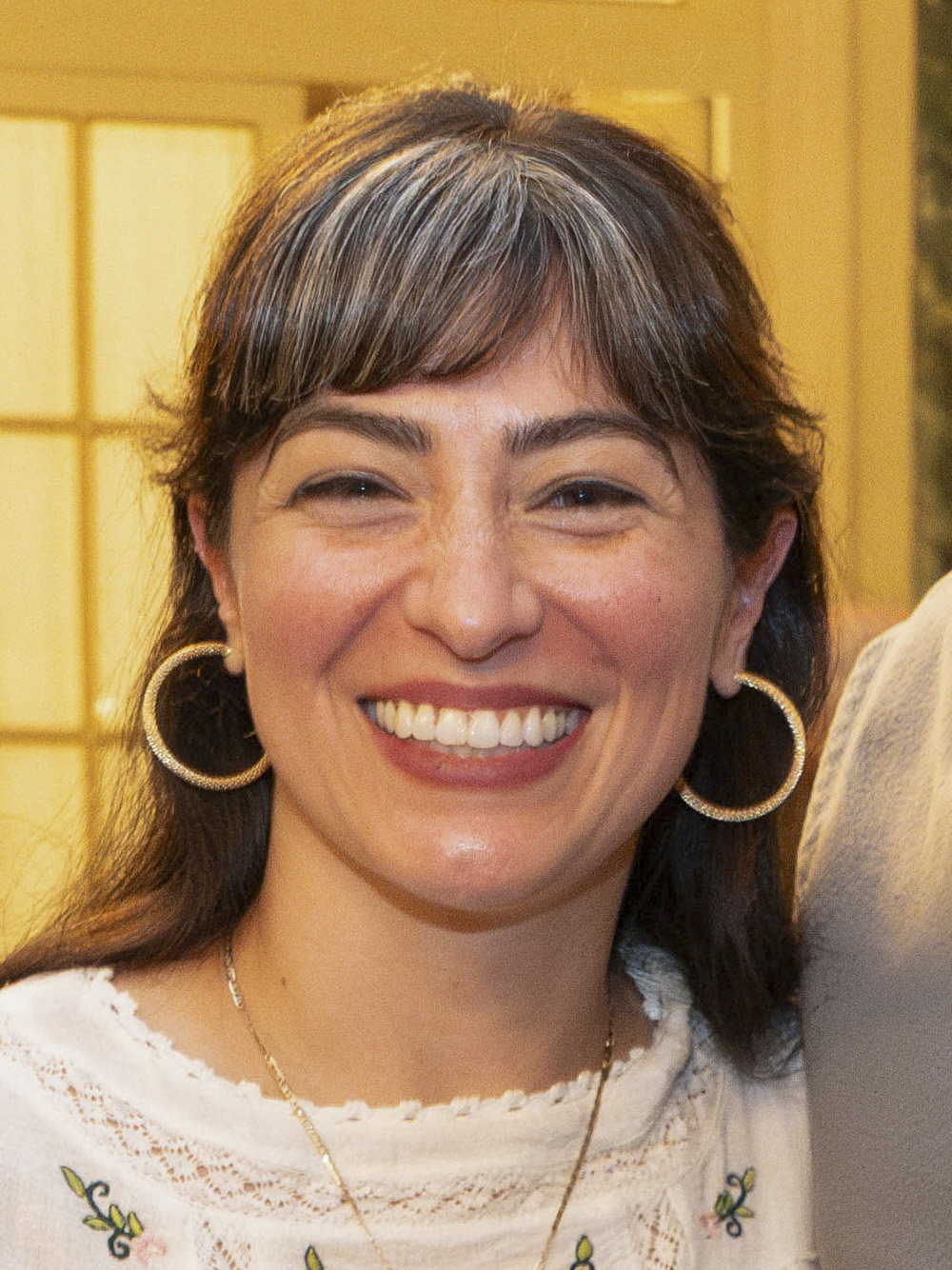
- Villaseñor in December 2024
- Born: October 9, 1987 (age 39); Whittier, California, U.S.
- Occupations: Comedian; actress; musician; illustrator

Comedy career
- Years active: 2010–present
- Medium: Stand-up; television; film; music
- Genres: Observational comedy; sketch comedy; blue comedy; musical comedy; impressions; surreal humor; satire
- Subjects: Latin American culture; everyday life; social awkwardness; race relations; mental health; human sexuality; self-deprecation; pop culture
- Website: melissavillasenor.com

Melissa Villaseñor (/ˌviːjəsɪnˈjɔːr/ VEE-yə-sin-YOR; born October 9, 1987) is an American comedian, actress, musician and illustrator. First garnering attention for her stand-up shows and impressions, Villaseñor found wider success when she was hired to join the cast of the NBC sketch comedy series Saturday Night Live ahead of the show's 42nd season in 2016. She then departed SNL at the end of the 47th season in 2022, after six seasons as a cast member.

== Early life and education ==
Melissa Villaseñor was born in Whittier, California, in Los Angeles County, on October 9, 1987, the daughter of Mexican parents Guadalupe "Lupe" Peralta and Miguel "Michael" Humberto Villaseñor. She is of Spanish, Basque, and indigenous Mexican descent, with roots in Jalisco and Aguascalientes, Mexico. Villaseñor is distantly related to director Alejandro González Iñárritu (a relation she and actor Mario Lopez share, as explored on their episode of Finding Your Roots).

Villaseñor attended the Catholic Ramona Convent Secondary School in Alhambra, California. As she described to Dana Carvey in interview, she got her start performing stand-up comedy at the age of 15, while at a Laugh Factory Comedy Camp (in Hollywood). Villaseñor later briefly attended Fullerton College.

== Career ==
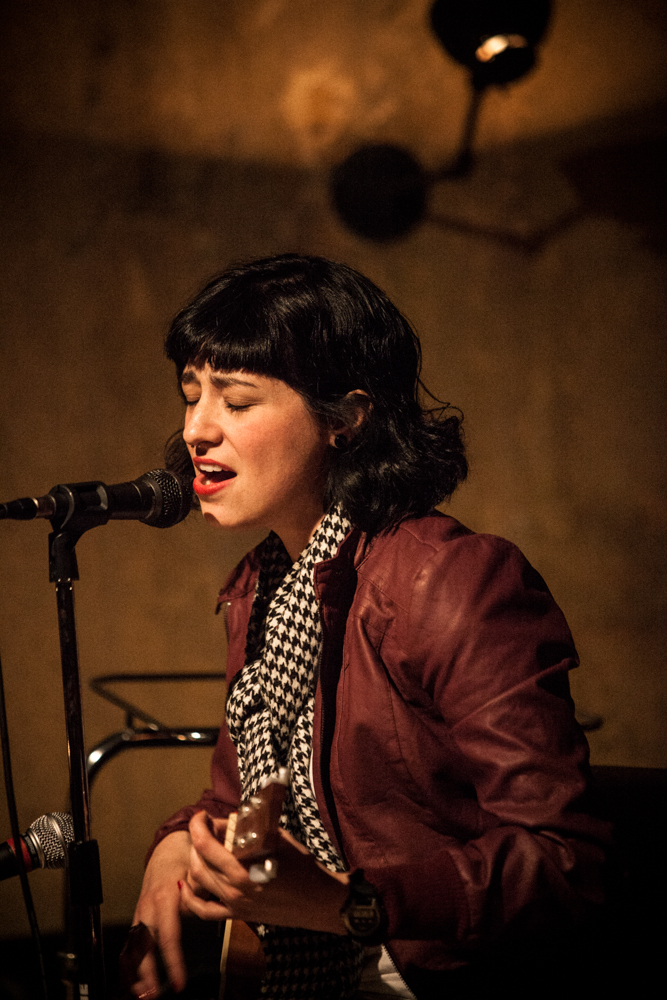
Villaseñor in 2013

Villaseñor was a semifinalist on the sixth season of America's Got Talent. Previously, she was selected for the New Faces lineup in the 2010 Just for Laughs Montreal Comedy Festival. She has also done voice work for the animated shows Adventure Time, Family Guy, and TripTank. She appeared on the second season of HBO's Crashing.

Villaseñor first auditioned for the late night sketch comedy/variety show Saturday Night Live in 2009, where she did several impressions but was not hired. Villaseñor was introduced as a featured player on the October 1, 2016 episode of Saturday Night Live, alongside Mikey Day and Alex Moffat. Her debut was an impression of Sarah Silverman in the Family Feud: Political Edition sketch. She is the second Latina cast member after Noël Wells, who is a quarter Mexican, and the first Latina to be promoted to repertory status. Villaseñor appeared between the show's 42nd and 47th seasons.

After she became a cast member, she deleted almost 2,000 old tweets, that she had posted mostly in 2010 and 2011, which some critics called racist. SNL and Villaseñor initially declined to comment on the accusation, but in September 2018, Villaseñor explained that she was "trying to be edgy" when she posted them, and that she did not regret deleting them. She told NPR's Weekend Edition Saturday, "I'm flawed like everyone else, and yeah, I just wanted to make sure I was perfect."

She was promoted to the cast's repertory players in season 44 in 2018. Villaseñor left the show at the end of the 47th season in 2022, after six years as a cast member.

Her debut album, Dreamer, a pop-punk/power pop-influenced work, was released in October 2019. She is also an illustrator.

She helped Rob Cantor create his viral video "29 Celebrity Impressions, 1 Original Song" to promote his album Not a Trampoline, in which she sings impressions of Britney Spears, Christina Aguilera, and Björk.

She hosted the 2021 Independent Spirit Awards, and voiced Robin in the radio drama podcast Batman: The Audio Adventures.

In June 2023, it was announced that she would voice Nellie Ramírez-Humphrey in Primos.

Villaseñor describes herself as a comedian and impressionist. She has performed impressions for America's Got Talent, First Impressions, her YouTube channel, and SNL including Björk, Owen Wilson, Gwen Stefani, Jennifer Lopez, Kate McKinnon, Kristen Wiig, Christina Aguilera, Britney Spears, Ana Navarro, Sia, Natalie Portman, Sarah Silverman, Lady Gaga, Billie Eilish, Dua Lipa and Alexandria Ocasio-Cortez.

== Filmography ==
Key
| † | Denotes films that have not yet been released |

=== Film ===
| Year | Title | Role | Notes |
|---|---|---|---|
| 2010 | The 41-Year-Old Virgin Who Knocked Up Sarah Marshall and Felt Superbad About It | Sara | |
| 2016 | Laid in America | Ms. Hopkins | |
| 2017 | Scooby-Doo! Shaggy's Showdown | Tawny (voice) | Direct-to-video |
| 2018 | Ralph Breaks the Internet | Taffyta Muttonfudge (voice) | |
| 2019 | Toy Story 4 | Karen Beverly (voice) | |
| 2020 | Hubie Halloween | Cat Owner Karen | |
| 2025 | Dog Man | Realtor (voice) | |
| 2025 | Gabby's Dollhouse: The Movie | Sunflower (voice) | |
| 2026 | Hoppers | Ellen (voice) | |
| 2026 | Toy Story 5 | Karen Beverly (voice) | |
| TBA | Close Personal Friends † | TBA | Post-production |

=== Television ===
| Year | Title | Role | Notes |
|---|---|---|---|
| 2011 | America's Got Talent | Herself/contestant | Semi-finalist |
| 2012 | Family Guy | Nora Ephron (voice) | Episode: "Tom Tucker: The Man and His Dream" |
| 2012–2016 | Adventure Time | Slime Princess, Moniker, Sveinn, additional voices | 11 episodes |
| 2014–2016 | TripTank | Various (voice) | 4 episodes |
| 2015 | Pickle and Peanut | Darla (voice) | Episode: "Francine/Cell Phone Tree" |
| 2016 | First Impressions | Herself/contestant | Episode: "Yvette Nicole Brown" |
| 2016–2022 | Saturday Night Live | Herself/various | Main role; 122 episodes |
| 2017 | Jeff & Some Aliens | Julie, Adele (voice) | Episode: "Jeff & Some Preteen Girls" |
| 2017 | F Is for Family | Additional voices | 2 episodes |
| 2017 | The David S. Pumpkins Halloween Special | Additional voices | Television special |
| 2017–2019 | OK K.O.! Let's Be Heroes | Drupe, Punching Judy, Potato, Ginger, Mega Football Baby, Shy Ninja, additional voices | 25 episodes |
| 2018 | Crashing | Herself | Episode: "NACA" |
| 2018 | Barry | Waitress | Episode: "Chapter One: Make Your Mark" |
| 2018–2019 | American Dad! | Various voices | 2 episodes |
| 2019 | Comedians in Cars Getting Coffee | Herself | Episode: "Melissa Villaseñor" |
| 2020 | Awkwafina Is Nora from Queens | Performer | Episode: "Paperwork" |
| 2020 | Summer Camp Island | Psychic (voice) | Episode: "Susie and Ramona Chapter 1: Susie's Ark" |
| 2021 | 36th Independent Spirit Awards | Herself (host) | Television special |
| 2021 | Archibald's Next Big Thing Is Here | Toothy, Hazel (voice) | 2 episodes |
| 2021 | Crank Yankers | Jennifer Lopez | Episode: "Adam Carolla, Punkie Johnson & Melissa Villaseñor" |
| 2021 | Q-Force | Various voices | 10 episodes |
| 2021 | Jellystone! | Susan (voice) | Episode: "El Kabong's Kabong is Gone" |
| 2021–2022 | Amphibia | Ally (voice) | 3 episodes |
| 2022 | Reindeer in Here | Candy (voice) | Television special |
| 2023 | Kung Fu Panda: The Dragon Knight | Akna (voice) | Recurring role; 23 episodes |
| 2023 | Night Court | Gabby | Episode: "When Abby Met Gabby" |
| 2023 | Is It Cake? | Herself / Judge | Episode: "That 90's Cake" |
| 2023 | Adventure Time: Fionna and Cake | Candy Cuffs, Babette, Heckler #1 (voice) | 2 episodes |
| 2024–2026 | Rock Paper Scissors | Pencil (voice) | Recurring role |
| 2024–2026 | Max & the Midknights | Millie (voice) | Main role |
| 2024–present | Ariel | Navi (voice) | Recurring role |
| 2024–2025 | Primos | Nellie Ramírez-Humphrey (voice) | Recurring role |
| 2025 | Win or Lose | Veronica (voice) | Secondary role |
| 2025 | Krapopolis | Helen, Grandma (voice) | Episode: "Love Week" |
| 2025 | Love, Death & Robots | Thermostat (voice) | Episode: "Smart Appliances, Stupid Owners" |
| 2025 | Kiff | Jeffy and Jerry Jo (voice) | Episode: "Kiff Loses Barry" |
| 2025 | Red Spike World | Poppy Arzake (voice) | Main role |

== Discography ==
Canciones Hermosas

- Released: February 14, 2025
- Format: Digital
- Tracks: "Si Nos Dejan", "El Reloj", "Que Nadie Sepa Mi Sufrir", "La Barca", "Mucho Corazon", "La Media Vuelta", "Sabor A Mi", "Piel Canela"

California (single)

- Released: June 19, 2021
- Format: Digital

Dreamer

- Released: October 9, 2019
- Format: Digital
- Label: Mira Bonita Productions
- Tracks: "Sweet Melissa", "Dreamin' You Up", "This Time Last Year", "Quiet", "Old Me", "Love Again", "Mom", "Shine", "Sponge and Rock"

Leap

- Released: December 19, 2013
- Format: Digital
- Tracks: "Puzzle Piece", "Leap into My Heart", "Free", "Rabbit Hole"
