= Tally Hall discography =

Rock band discography

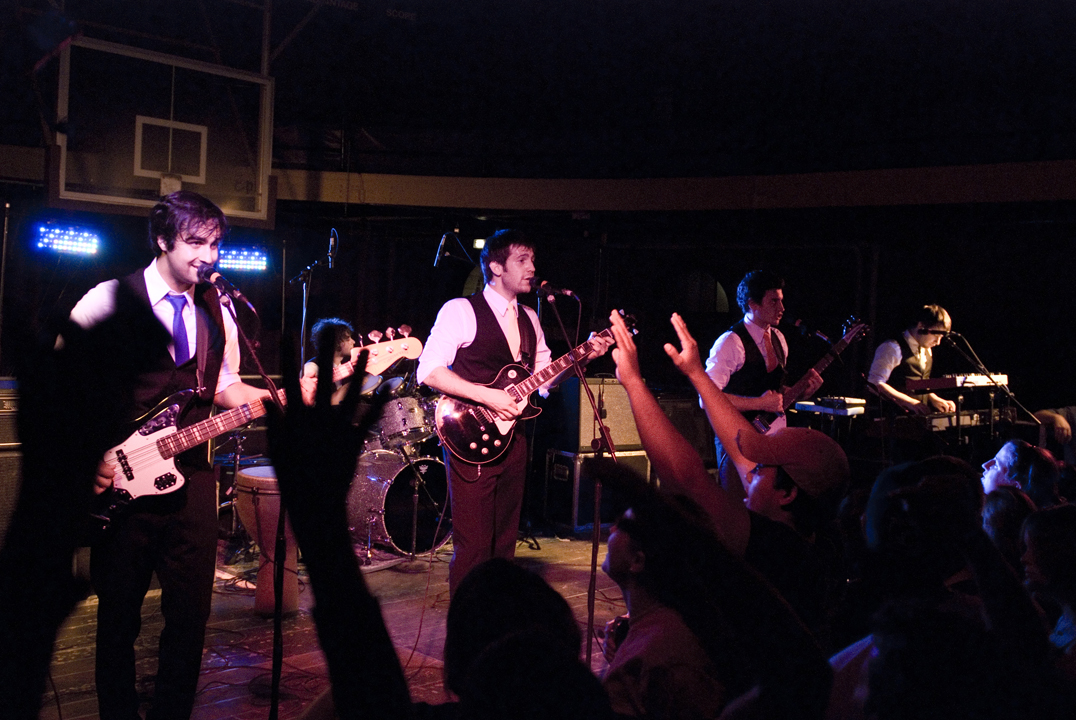
- Tally Hall performing in 2008
- Studio albums: 2
- EPs: 5
- Compilation albums: 2
- Singles: 6
- Music videos: 10
- Promotional singles: 2
- Appearances: 5

The discography of Tally Hall, an American rock band, consists of two studio albums, two compilation albums, five extended plays (EPs), six singles, two promotional singles, nine music videos (on YouTube) and five appearances on compilation and soundtrack albums or in video collections. The band was formed in 2002 while attending the University of Michigan. A year later, they recorded their debut EP, Party Boobytrap, followed by their second release, Welcome to Tally Hall, in 2004. The latter incorporated a larger spectrum of styles, and the two EPs were combined on the full-length Complete Demos the same year.

In 2005, the band released their debut album Marvin's Marvelous Mechanical Museum on the local label Quack! Media. The track "Good Day" was featured on the teen drama series The O.C. in 2006, and Tally Hall was subsequently signed to Atlantic Records, who released a re-recorded version of the album in 2008. The band's second album, Good & Evil, was funded by the label and released in 2011 by Quack! Media after Tally Hall split ways with Atlantic. A second demo compilation titled Admittedly Incomplete Demos was released in 2015 through Bandcamp. In January 2021 and August 2022, Needlejuice Records opened pre-ordering for the first and second studio albums on physical formats.

== Albums ==
=== Studio albums ===
List of studio albums, with selected chart positions
Title	Details	Peak chart positions			Ref.
Title	Details	PH	SG	VN	Ref.
Marvin's Marvelous Mechanical Museum	Released: October 24, 2005 (Note: Marvin's Marvelous Mechanical Museum was re-recorded and released by Atlantic Records on April 1, 2008.); Recorded: June–October 2005, May–June 2007 (re-release); Label: Quack! Media, Atlantic, Needlejuice; Format: Vinyl, CD, cassette, LP, minidisc, 8-Track	—		29	
Good & Evil	Released: June 21, 2011; Recorded: October 26, 2009 – November 26, 2009; Label: Quack! Media, Needlejuice; Format: Vinyl, CD, cassette, LP, minidisc, 8-Track	96	48	—	
"—" denotes a recording that did not chart or was not released in that territory.

=== Compilation albums ===
List of compilation albums
Title	Details	Ref.
Complete Demos	Released: November 11, 2004; Recorded: April 2003, November 2003, Late 2004; Label: self-released; Format: CD, digital download	
Admittedly Incomplete Demos	Released: December 15, 2015; Recorded: December 2002 – November 2009; Label: self-released; Format: digital download	

== Extended plays ==
List of extended plays
Title	Details	Ref.
Party Boobytrap E.P.	Released: April 2003 (Note: A release titled partyboobytrap e.p. +1−1 is also listed on the band's TalentMatch page.); Recorded: 2003; Label: self-released; Format: CD	
Welcome to Tally Hall E.P.	Released: May 14, 2004; Recorded: November 2003, April 2004; Label: self-released; Format: CD	
The Pingry E.P.	Released: May 13, 2005; Label: self-released; Format: CD	
Residency Tour E.P.	Released: April 2006; Label: Quack! Media; Format: CD	
Just a Friend E.P.	Released: 2021; Recorded: 2006 (Just a Friend), 2008 (Mucka Blucka, Dream); Label: Needlejuice; Format: Vinyl, digital download	

== Singles ==
List of singles, with selected chart positions
Title	Year	Peak chart positions		Certifications	Album	Ref.
Title	Year	BR	DK	Certifications	Album	Ref.
"Banana Man"	2003	—	—		Complete Demos	
"Good Day"	2008	—			Marvin's Marvelous Mechanical Museum (Atlantic Records reissue)	
"You & Me"	2011	84	—		Good & Evil	
"Club Can't Handle Me" (featuring Casey Shea)	2011	—	—		Non-album single	
"Just a Friend"	2019	—	80		Admittedly Incomplete Demos	
"Turn the Lights Off"	2022	—	—	RIAA: Gold	Good & Evil	
"—" denotes a recording that did not chart or was not released in that territory.

=== Promotional singles ===
List of promotional singles, with selected chart positions
Title	Year	Peak chart positions	Album	Ref.
Title	Year	ZA	Album	Ref.
"Good Day"	2005	—	Marvin's Marvelous Mechanical Museum	
"Welcome to Tally Hall"	2008	—	Marvin's Marvelous Mechanical Museum (Atlantic Records reissue)	95
"—" denotes a recording that did not chart or was not released in that territory.

=== Other charting songs ===
List of other charting songs, with selected chart positions
Title	Year	Peak chart positions						Certifications	Album
Title	Year	BE	BR	HU	NO	VN	ZA	Certifications	Album
"Taken for a Ride"	2005	—	—	—			93		Marvin's Marvelous Mechanical Museum
"The Bidding"	2005	—	—	75	51	—	—	RIAA: Gold	Marvin's Marvelous Mechanical Museum
"The Whole World and You"	2005	79	—	—		—	—		Marvin's Marvelous Mechanical Museum
"13"	2005	—	—	—		—	87		Marvin's Marvelous Mechanical Museum
"Hidden in the Sand"	2005	—	—	—		66	—	RIAA: Platinum	Marvin's Marvelous Mechanical Museum
"Cannibal"	2011	—	93	—		—	—		Good & Evil
"Out in the Twilight"	2011	—	—	—		—	84		Good & Evil
"—" denotes a recording that did not chart or was not released in that territory.

== Music videos ==
List music videos that Tally Hall has released
Title	Director	Album	Ref.
"Banana Man"	Joe Hawley	Complete Demos	
"Greener"	Tally Hall	Marvin's Marvelous Mechanical Museum	
"Good Day"	Joe Hawley	Marvin's Marvelous Mechanical Museum	
"Welcome to Tally Hall"	Sean Stewart	Marvin's Marvelous Mechanical Museum	
"Two Wuv"	Tally Hall	Marvin's Marvelous Mechanical Museum	
"The Whole World and You"	Frankie Cordero	Marvin's Marvelous Mechanical Museum	
"Ruler of Everything"	Sean Donnelly	Marvin's Marvelous Mechanical Museum	
"Hidden in the Sand"	Steve Loter	Marvin's Marvelous Mechanical Museum	
"Dream"	Tally Hall	Marvin's Marvelous Mechanical Museum	
"Turn the Lights Off"	Drew Mokris	Good & Evil	

== Appearances on compilations and soundtracks ==
=== Music ===
List of compilation and soundtrack albums on which Tally Hall has appeared
Year	Title	Track(s)	Ref.
2006	Music from the O.C., Mix 6 – Covering Our Tracks	"Smile Like You Mean It"	
2008	Best Damn Sampler	"Good Day"	
2009	The Magician's Elephant	"Light & Night" (featuring Nellie McKay)	(Note: "Light & Night was later released as the B-side of "Turn the Lights Off" by Needlejuice Records in 2022.)

=== Video ===
List of compilation video collections in which Tally Hall has appeared
Year	Title	Track(s)	Ref.
2008	RSD041908	"Good Day"	
2008	Modern Rock May 2008	"Good Day"	
