= Turn the Lights Off (Tally Hall song) =

2011 song by Tally Hall

- Cover art for the 2022 single.

Single by Tally Hall

from the album Good & Evil
- B-side: "Light & Night"
- Released: June 21, 2011 (album); August 26, 2022 (single)
- Studio: The Sound Factory, Los Angeles, California
- Length: 2:56
- Label: Quack! Media (album); Needlejuice (single)
- Songwriter: Joe Hawley
- Producer: Tony Hoffer

"Turn the Lights Off" is a song by the American rock band Tally Hall. It was initially released as the tenth track for the band's second album, Good & Evil on June 21, 2011, and was later released as a 7" vinyl single by Needlejuice Records on August 26, 2022. The song received a resurgence of popularity in the early 2020s due to virality on social media platforms like TikTok. This extended commercial success culminated in November 2025 when the song was officially certified Gold by the Recording Industry Association of America (RIAA).

== Composition ==
"Turn the Lights Off" features lead vocals from guitarist and lead vocalist Joe Hawley along with backing vocals from bassist Zubin Sedghi and guitarist Rob Cantor.

== Release and reception ==
The song was released as a part of the band's second studio album as the tenth track. In October 2011, Tally Hall released the only music video in support of Good & Evil, this being "Turn the Lights Off". It was directed and animated by Drew Morkis. Upon the album's release, Alex Young writing for Consequence (formerly Consequence of Sound) described the song as "playful" and noted "One can truly have fun when their creative lyrics are mashed with feverish keys and layered vocals (...)".

The song then became popular due to a resurgence in the band's popularity driven by trends on social media platforms like TikTok, leading to a sudden spike in streams on Spotify, quickly gaining over 100 million streams. As a result of this sudden popularity, on November 25, 2025, along with "Hidden in the Sand", the song was certified Gold by the Recording Industry Association of America (RIAA) for exceeding 500,000 certified units.

== Certifications ==
Certifications and sales for "Turn the Lights Off"
Region	Certification	Certified units/sales
United States (RIAA)	Gold	500,000^{‡}
^{‡} Sales+streaming figures based on certification alone.

== Personnel ==
Credits are adapted from the liner notes of Good & Evil and the 7-inch vinyl liner notes of "Turn The Lights Off".

=== Tally Hall ===
- Joe Hawley – vocals, guitar
- Rob Cantor – vocals, guitar
- Zubin Sedghi – vocals, bass
- Andrew Horowitz – keyboards
- Ross Federman – drums

=== Additional contributors ===
- Tony Hoffer – production
- Todd Burke – recording
- Wren Rider – studio tech
- Angel Marcloid – mastering (single)
- Drew Morkis – cover artwork (single)
- Brandon Brown – layout (single)
