= Perfect (Rob Cantor song) =

2012 song by Rob Cantor

Song by Rob Cantor

from the album Not a Trampoline
- Released: April 14, 2014
- Studio: The Laboratory (Los Angeles)
- Length: 3:21
- Songwriters: Rob Cantor; Andrew Horowitz
- Producers: Gregtonic; Andrew Horowitz

Audio
- "Perfect" on YouTube

Music video
- "29 Celebrity Impressions, 1 Original Song" on YouTube

"Perfect" is a song by American singer-songwriter Rob Cantor. It was released on April 14, 2014, on his solo debut album, Not a Trampoline. A video for the song titled "29 Celebrity Impressions, 1 Original Song" was published to YouTube on July 1, featuring Cantor performing impressions. It became a viral video, with viewers in disbelief by it before Cantor later revealed it to be purposefully deceiving.

== Background ==
After the indefinite hiatus of Tally Hall in 2011, co-lead vocalist and guitarist Rob Cantor began producing solo work. He first released the viral song "Shia LaBeouf" in 2012, followed by his solo debut album Not a Trampoline in 2014. The album features "Perfect", co-written by Cantor with bandmate and keyboardist Andrew Horowitz. The latter reunited with the former in Los Angeles six months after Tally Hall's hiatus, spending time together before writing "Perfect" between 11 PM and 5 AM the same day.

== Music video ==
On July 1, 2014, Cantor published the video "29 Celebrity Impressions, 1 Original Song" to his YouTube channel. Accompanied by Horowitz on the piano, Cantor appears to sing 28 impressions of various celebrities and one of himself. It received over 740 thousand views within its first day, amassing 6.5 million total views throughout the week. The video received particular attention for the bizarreness of being able to perform several female impressions as a male singer. Cantor expressed happiness with the song's spread as a viral video, stating "I'm so glad people enjoy the clip, and I'm even happier they seem to dig the song!" to Today.

The video includes impressions of Randy Newman, Jack Black, Kermit the Frog, Louis Armstrong, Christopher Lloyd, Willie Nelson, Bono, Gollum, Steve Buscemi, Billie Holiday, Frank Sinatra, Peter Griffin, Gilbert Gottfried, Ray Romano, Adam Sandler, Gwen Stefani, Patrick Warburton, Ian McKellen, Shakira, Britney Spears, Jeff Goldblum, Christopher Walken, Jon Lovitz, Christina Aguilera, Cher, Flipper, Björk, and Bob Dylan. Cantor additionally whistles, imitates a trumpet, and does a "self-impression".

=== Production ===
On July 9, a making-of video was published, revealing that the music video's impressions were lip synced by Cantor over dubbed audio of 11 other impressionists. Recorded in 39 takes, the video was recorded and edited in the style of a home movie to generate believability in the hoax. A representative of Cantor described the video as "a carefully orchestrated effort", successfully promoting Not a Trampoline through the video's popularity.

== Personnel ==
"Perfect"

- Rob Cantor – lead vocals, instruments
- Gregtonic – production, mixing engineer
- Andrew Horowitz – production
- Bora Karaca – engineer
- Dave Cooley – mastering

"29 Celebrity Impressions, 1 Original Song"

- Rob Cantor – miming, direction
- Andrew Horowitz – piano, backing vocals
- Brock Baker – vocals
- Gilbert Gauthier – vocals
- Amanda Gari – vocals
- Reagan James – vocals
- Andrew Laurich – vocals
- Andy McCloud – vocals
- Piotr Michael – vocals
- Missy Modell – vocals
- Mark Sipka – vocals
- Melissa Villaseñor – vocals
- Bora Karaca – whistling
- Gabe Steiner – trumpet
- Lindsey Alvarez – sound design, mixing engineer
