= Marvin's Marvelous Mechanical Museum =

Museum in West Bloomfield, Michigan

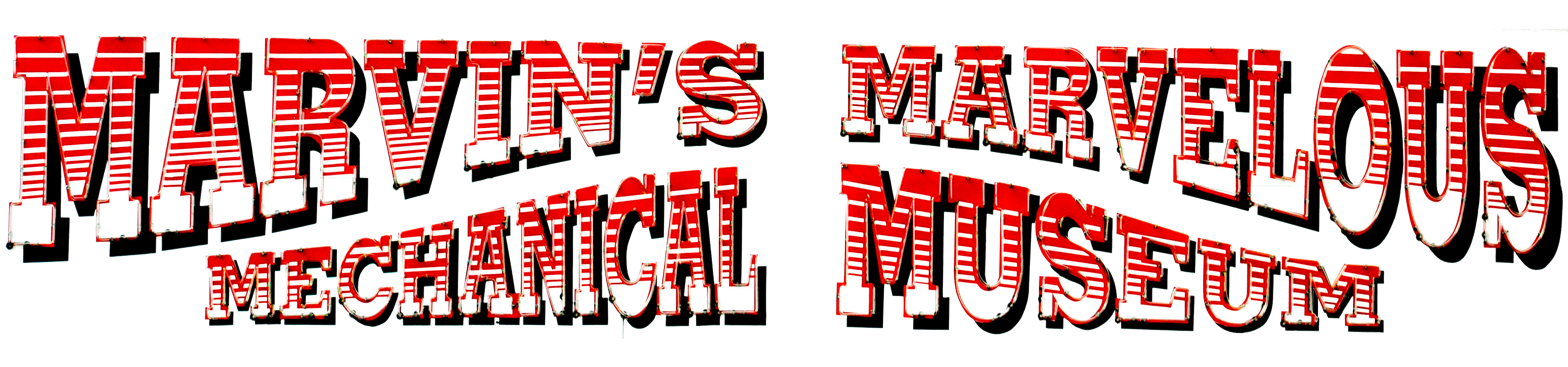

- Exterior of current location
- Established: 1980; 46 years ago (first iteration); 1990; 36 years ago (second iteration); October 25, 2026; 21 days ago (third iteration)
- Dissolved: 1988; 38 years ago (first iteration); January 5, 2025; 22 months ago (second iteration)
- Location: 6445 Orchard Lake Road; West Bloomfield, Michigan, U.S.
- Coordinates: 42.544596°N 83.359053°W
- Collections: Arcade games Animatronics; Memorabilia
- Founder: Marvin Yagoda
- Owner: Jeremy Yagoda
- Public transit access: SMART 405, 780, 851
- Parking: On site (no charge)
- Website: www.marvin3m.com

Marvin's Marvelous Mechanical Museum is an amusement arcade and museum located in West Bloomfield, Michigan. It features a large collection of vintage arcade games and other coin-operated entertainment machines, most of which are functional and can be operated by visitors. Exhibits include the fortune teller machine that used to feature in many carnival sideshows.

== History ==
Marvin's Marvelous Mechanical Museum was founded by Marvin Yagoda, a pharmacist who collected, restored, and sold antique arcade machines. Yagoda initially housed his collections in his garage, but at the suggestion of his wife, he installed some of his machines in the food court of the Tally Hall shopping center in Farmington Hills, Michigan beginning in 1980. He later rented a space in the mall until it closed in 1988; and reopened after the mall was rebuilt as Orchard Lake Plaza (now known as Hunter's Square) in 1990.

Marquee of second Farmington Hills location, open from 1990 until 2025, demolished November 2025

Interior of the second Farmington Hills location on the day of its closure

Yagoda became a recognized expert in the field of mechanical and electrical game apparatus; he has been involved in appraisal of such items for the television series American Pickers. He died on January 8, 2017, at the age of 78, after which his son, Jeremy, assumed control of the museum.

=== Relocation ===
In November 2023, RPT Realty, then-owner of Hunter's Square, proposed a major redevelopment of the center, which would involve demolishing its northern building, which contained Marvin's, to construct a Meijer Grocery store. Jeremy Yagoda vowed to fight "tooth and nail" against the proposal, and an online petition opposing the plan gathered more than 50,000 signatures on Change.org. The redevelopment plan was unanimously approved by the Farmington Hills Planning Commission during its November 16, 2023 meeting, at which dozens of supporters of the museum spoke in opposition to the plan.

Yagoda stated that he would continue discussions with RPT to remain at Hunter's Square as part of its redevelopment, or seek a new location for the museum. RPT sold the center to a local developer in April 2024.

Yagoda announced in December 2024 that the museum had secured a new location at the Orchard Mall, 1.5 miles (2.4 km) to the north in neighboring West Bloomfield. The new space has an area of 14,000 square feet (1,300.6 m^{2}), more than double the size of the museum's previous 5,500-square-foot (510 m^{2}) space. The Hunter's Square location closed permanently on January 5, 2025, with announced plans to reopen in the new location in the summer of 2025; the announced reopening date was later delayed to that fall.

Interior of the current location

The museum's famous marquee sign was removed in April 2025 and sold to Tilt Amusements of Ostrander, Ohio, and the building was demolished that November. In February 2026, Jeremy Yagoda announced that the museum's relocation was behind schedule and significantly over budget, and launched a GoFundMe fundraising page to collect donations to complete the project. While previously planned to reopen in April 2026, the opening was delayed due to unforeseen plumbing issues. The museum reportedly reopened in its new location on October 25, 2026.

== Collection ==
Among the collection is P. T. Barnum's replica of the Cardiff Giant, one of Sing Sing Prison's electric chairs in which 30 people died, and "Dr. Ralph Bingenpurge", an automaton "food inspector", set up to continuously vomit into a pile of wine bottles, as well as other automata and vintage arcade games of up to 100 years old. There are modern coin-op arcade video games, and a prize counter to exchange tickets. The museum hosts a collection of Chuck E. Cheese's Pizza Time Theatre animatronics with a complete set of the Pizza Time Players (excluding Chuck E.) with guest stars Madame Oink and the clapper board.

== In popular culture ==
The 2005 album Marvin's Marvelous Mechanical Museum, by the band Tally Hall from nearby Ann Arbor, is named after the museum. The album includes a backmasked message, spoken by Marvin Yagoda, at the end of the song 'Hidden In The Sand.'

== See also ==
- List of magic museums
