= Albino Blacksheep =

Animation website

- Website type: Entertainment website
- Owner: Steven Lerner
- Creator: Steven Lerner
- Website: AlbinoBlacksheep.com
- Commercial: No
- Registration: Optional
- Launched: 1996; 30 years ago
- Current status: Active

Albino Blacksheep (ABS) is an animation website based in Toronto, Ontario, Canada. It publishes member submitted digital media made with Adobe Flash. The website also features image galleries, audio files, and text files, and flash games along with a mobile section that provided ring tones, screensavers, and wallpaper for mobile phones.

The website was a major hub for Flash animation and early viral videos in the late 1990s to mid-2000s, helping contribute to early Internet culture.

== History ==
Albino Blacksheep was proposed in 1995 by Steven Lerner, to promote his band of the same name, which was started in 1996. Very little information on the band Albino Blacksheep exists. In 2000, Lerner took a web design course and redesigned the website. This new incarnation contained rants, graphical images, and a video stream from Lerner's video camera.

Albino Blacksheep is also famous for being a major portal for Flash animation and animutation (a Flash animation style). The popular Web game Musical Lantern can be found on this site. The website also helped the band Tally Hall achieve some notability after posting their music video Banana Man.
