= The Bidding =

Song by Tally Hall

from the album Marvin's Marvelous Mechanical Museum
- Released: October 24, 2005
- Studio: Stratosphere Sound (New York); Sterling Sound (New York)
- Genre: Alternative rock; funk rock; garage rock; power pop
- Length: 2:29, 2:40 (re-issue)
- Songwriter: Joe Hawley
- Producers: Chris Shaw & Tally Hall

Audio
- "The Bidding" on YouTube

"The Bidding" is a song by American rock band Tally Hall. It was released on October 24, 2005, as track 5 of Marvin's Marvelous Mechanical Museum. The song was written by Joe Hawley with vocals led by Hawley, Rob Cantor, and Zubin Sedghi. It received generally positive reception, amassing over 249 million streams on Spotify and 32 million plays on YouTube. In 2019, the song became a viral song on the social media platform TikTok, with many using the beginning verse and two ending verses as a sped-up soundbite on the site.

== Background and composition ==
In early 2005, "The Bidding" was released on Broadjam as a solo demo by Hawley. The demo features some different melodies and lyrics, most notably missing any lyrical outro. A demo later released on Tally Hall's third EP, The Pingry EP, features a full band recording from a University of Michigan studio with updated lyrics. The track would be re-recorded a third time with finalized details, such as the inclusion of Ross Federman's vocals in the bridge. This would be the version featured on Marvin's Marvelous Mechanical Museum.

After signing with Atlantic Records, Tally Hall was approved to re-record the song a fourth time at Stratosphere Sound Recording Studios in NYC. "The Bidding" is composed in 4/4 common time and in the key of A minor. The tempo of the original recording is 186 beats per minute (bpm), while its 2008 counterpart has a tempo of 175 beats per minute.

== Personnel ==
Credits adapted from the album's liner notes.

Tally Hall

- Rob Cantor – lead vocals, guitar
- Joe Hawley – lead vocals, guitar, songwriting
- Zubin Sedghi – lead vocals, bass
- Ross Federman – drums, percussion, auctioneer voice
- Andrew Horowitz – keyboards

Other musicians

- Bora Karaca – choir
- Chris Shaw (Note: 2008 version only) – rock guitar, mixing engineer, producer
- Greg Calbi - mastering
- Steve Peterson - trombone
- David Tenerelli - trumpet
- Matt Lyon - tuba
- Jason Ceo - choir
- Greg Jaffe - choir
- Donald Milton III - choir
- Michael Steelman - choir
- Victor Szabo - choir
- Brett Trzcinski - choir
- Tim Wagner - choir
- Jon Zande - choir

== Charts ==
Weekly chart performance for "The Bidding"
Chart (2020–2022)	Peak position
Hungary Top 100 Rock Songs (Apple Music)	75
Norway Top 100 Rock Songs (iTunes)	51
Vietnam Top 100 Rock Songs (Apple Music)	95

== Certifications ==
Certifications and sales for "The Bidding"
Region	Certification	Certified units/sales
United States (RIAA)	Gold	500,000^{‡}
^{‡} Sales+streaming figures based on certification alone.
