= Tally Hall =

American rock band

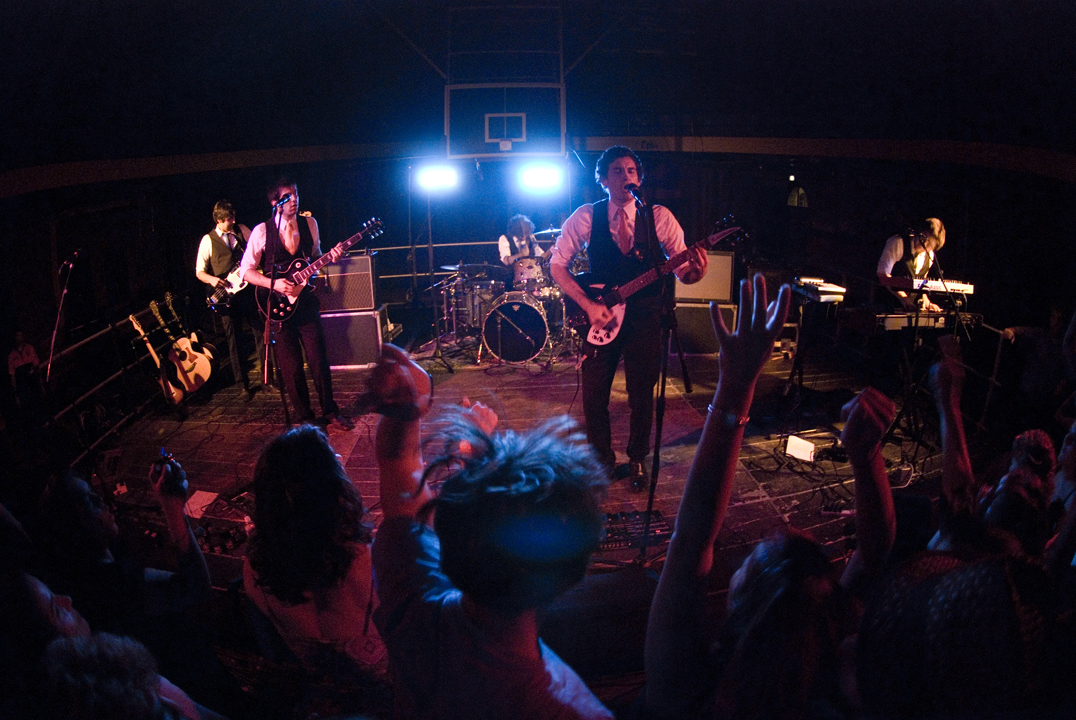
- Tally Hall performing in Massachusetts in 2008. From left: Sedghi, Cantor, Federman, Hawley and Horowitz

Background information
- Also known as: 540 (2002–2003); Gallagher (2003); PartyBoobyTrap (2003)
- Origin: Ann Arbor, Michigan, U.S.
- Genres: Pop rock; alternative rock; indie rock; power pop
- Works: Discography
- Years active: 2002–present (hiatus: 2011–2026)
- Labels: Quack! Media; Atlantic; Needlejuice
- Spinoffs: Toy Orchestra; Miracle Musical
- Members: Rob Cantor; Zubin Sedghi; Andrew Horowitz; Ross Federman
- Past members: Steve Gallagher; Joe Hawley
- Website: tallyhall.com
- Tally Hall's logo.

Tally Hall is an American pop rock (Note: Attributed to multiple sources.) band formed in Ann Arbor, Michigan, in December 2002. The band's line-up consists of guitarist Rob Cantor, bassist Zubin Sedghi, keyboardist Andrew Horowitz, and drummer Ross Federman. The band is known for its matching outfits featuring white button up shirts, colored neckties, and from 2008 to 2011, black vests. The members originally described their musical style as wonky rock, later redefining their sound as fabloo (/fəˈbluː/ fə-BLOO), to not let any particular genres define their music after critics began defining the characteristics of wonky rock.

After releasing various demo EPs, the band signed with indie label Quack! Media to release their debut studio album, Marvin's Marvelous Mechanical Museum on October 24, 2005. In March 2007, the band signed with major label Atlantic Records, partially re-recording and re-releasing their debut album on April 1, 2008, alongside a web series called Tally Hall's Internet Show to promote it.

In 2009, the band recorded their second album, Good & Evil, whose release was delayed by two years due to their relationship with Atlantic falling apart. The band returned to Quack! Media and released Good & Evil in 2011. After a tour to promote the album, the band went on a hiatus that lasted 15 years, during which the members all pursued various interests, music related or otherwise. In 2026, after a month of renewed social media activity, the band reunited and announced a 2027 tour of the United States.

== History ==
=== Early years and Marvin's Marvelous Mechanical Museum (2002–2008) ===
Andrew Horowitz, who was born in Warren, New Jersey, began writing songs when he was eight years old and studied composition at the University of Michigan. There he met Rob Cantor, who had attended high school with Zubin Sedghi. Cantor and Sedghi had previously played in a band called listedBlack in high school. The three soon decided to play music together, going under the name 540 and playing small shows at the university. At the same time, fellow Michigan student Joe Hawley was studying film, and had formed the sketch comedy group anonyMous. Cantor eventually joined this group, and through this connection soon invited Hawley to join 540 upon learning he could play guitar, and had some musical experience writing songs for his film projects. The lineup was rounded out by drummer Steve Gallagher, and they soon went under various other names, such as Gallagher and PartyBoobyTrap. They eventually settled on Tally Hall, named after a local mall's food court. This lineup recorded various demo EPs, which were later collected and released as Complete Demos in November 2004. Before the release however, Gallagher suddenly left the group in May of that year. He was replaced by Ross Federman, who had attended the same high school as Hawley, after the latter heard him bragging about his drum skills while passing by his dorm. In 2004, Horowitz won first place and a $10,000 prize in the John Lennon Scholarship competition, presented by Yoko Ono and BMI for writing the song "Good Day". Following graduation in 2005, Cantor turned down a full scholarship to the University of Michigan Medical School, while Sedghi and Federman postponed further studies.

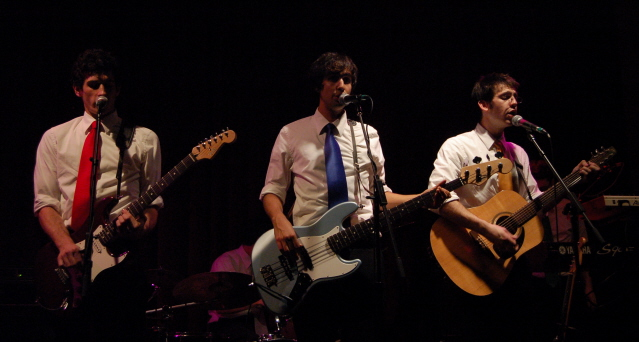
Tally Hall performing in Philadelphia in October 2006

In 2005, the band signed with independent record label Quack! Media, and on October 24, released their debut studio album, Marvin's Marvelous Mechanical Museum, with violinist Jeremy Kittel contributing strings. They were awarded first place in the pop category of the John Lennon Songwriting Contest in 2005 with the song "Just Apathy" from the album. Tally Hall went on to receive national media attention, performing their song "Good Day" on The Late Late Show with Craig Ferguson on August 2, 2006, as well as appearing in MTV's segment "You Hear It First" in September 2006. In order to capitalize on this attention, they re-released Marvin's on September 12, 2006. The band appeared at the 2007 South by Southwest Music Festival. They signed to Atlantic Records in March 2007, partially re-recording Marvin's at Stratosphere Sound with producer Chris Shaw and re-releasing it for a second time on April 1, 2008, this time with new cover art, alongside three new bonus tracks, one being a cover of Biz Markie's song "Just a Friend", which had been a live staple of the band for years. In August 2008, Tally Hall was a performer on the BMI stage at Lollapalooza.

Tally Hall was invited back by The Late Late Show with Craig Ferguson on September 16, 2008, to help promote the launch of Tally Hall's Internet Show, a sketch comedy series the band had made in order to promote the Marvin's re-release. They performed "Welcome to Tally Hall" in newly donned black vests on top of their traditional colored ties, white shirts, and black pants. The band worked on several projects after the completion of Marvin's Marvelous Mechanical Museum, including covering the song "Smile Like You Mean It" by The Killers for the sixth The O.C. soundtrack: Music from the OC: Mix 6. In August 2008, "Good Day" was included on the soundtrack for The Sims 2: Apartment Life. During this time, Tally Hall also provided the vocals and music for songs in Happy Monster Band, a children's television series that aired on Playhouse Disney.

=== Tours and Good & Evil (2009–2011) ===
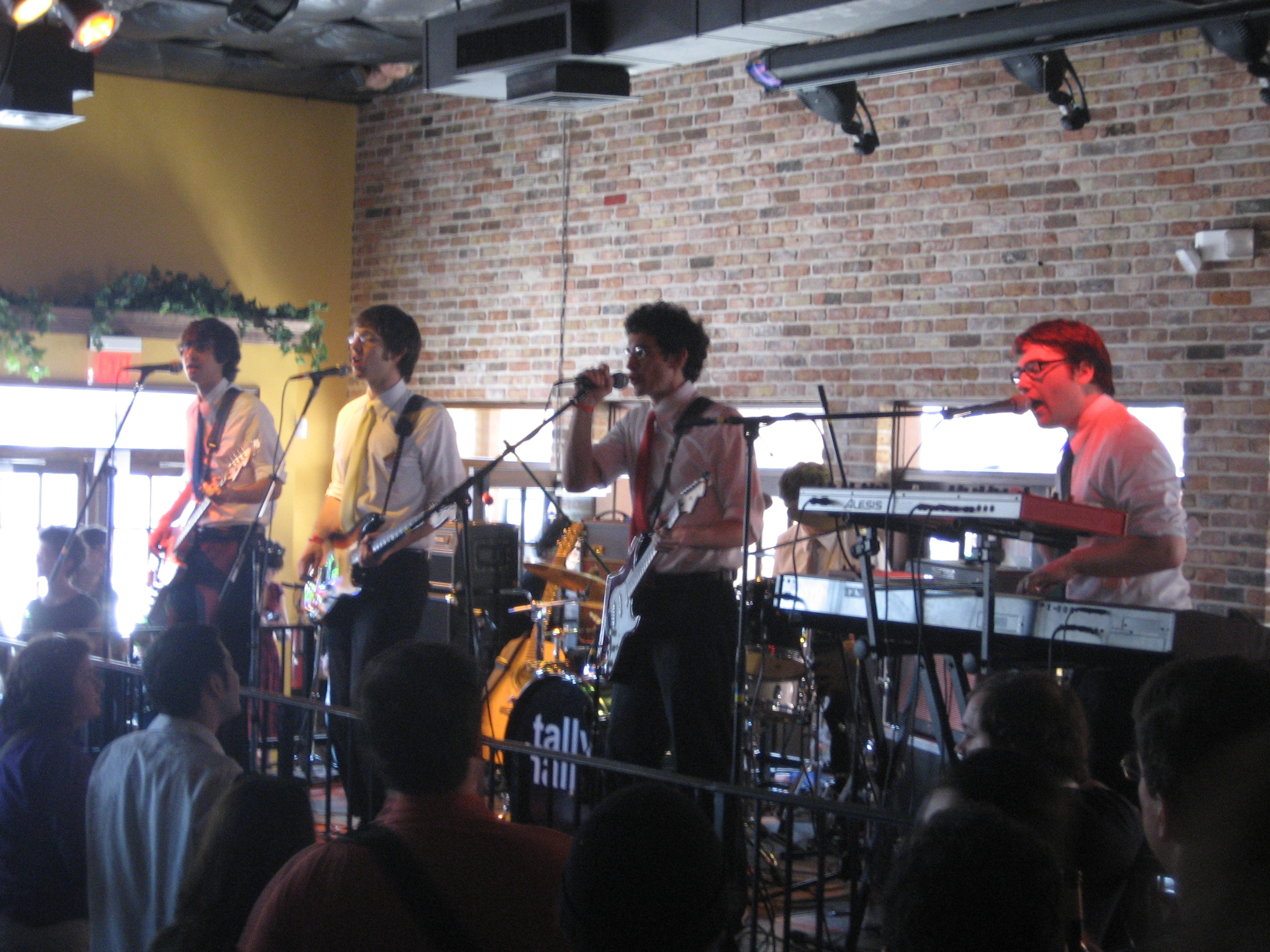
Tally Hall in Downtown Austin, Texas in 2007.

On September 9, 2009, Tally Hall released the song "Light & Night", featuring Nellie McKay, as a free download when customers of Walmart purchased The Magician's Elephant by Kate DiCamillo, published the same day.

In the band's 2010 March tour with Jukebox the Ghost and Skybox, Joe Hawley backed out of the tour due to issues in his personal life and was subsequently replaced with Casey Shea, who wore a black tie, and filled in for him for the rest of their live shows that year. On March 25, 2011, the band announced that all five original band members were still together. Later in the year, the band changed their management from The Hornblow Group, which also managed They Might Be Giants and OK Go, to Stiletto Entertainment, who manages solo performance acts such as Barry Manilow.

Their second album, Good & Evil, was released on June 21, 2011, under their original label, Quack! Media. The album had been recorded in late 2009, but due to repeated delays caused by their deal with Atlantic Records falling apart, it was released two years after it had originally been recorded. Its lead single, "You & Me", premiered via Consequence of Sound in May 2011. To promote the album, the band held a contest where the winner would be awarded a song written about them. The winner was a high school student named Nathan Naimark, whose self-titled theme song would be released soon after. Around the same time, the band released a cover of the Flo Rida song "Club Can't Handle Me", with Shea on guest vocals. According to Horowitz, the origin of the cover came from a suggestion the band had made to Atlantic Records, where they would record and release covers of other artists signed to the label weekly, with the song presented as an example. The label rejected the idea, leading the band to release the song after they had parted ways with them. The band proceeded to go on a summer US tour in support of Good & Evil, with friend of the band and multi-instrumentalist Bora Karaca, who wore an orange tie, joining them as a touring member. The band played their last show on August 20, 2011, at Mr. Smalls Theatre in Millvale, Pennsylvania.

After the release of Good & Evil and its tour, Tally Hall became inactive with all band members going on to independent endeavors, though some of the projects had multiple members collaborate once again.

=== Solo work after Good & Evil (2011–2026) ===
Rob Cantor released the songs "Shia LaBeouf" and "Christian Bale Is At Your Party" in 2012, which quickly went viral. The live orchestral video for "Shia LaBeouf" won a Webby Award for Comedy in 2015. His solo debut album followed as Not a Trampoline on April 14, 2014, featuring another viral video titled "29 Celebrity Impressions, 1 Original Song". Cantor shifted to commercial work after, writing and producing songs for several Disney Junior shows. Andrew Horowitz began making music under the moniker Edu, releasing the solo album Sketches (2012) and reissuing it as Sketches 3d (2019). He additionally provided production and piano on John Legend's Love in the Future in 2013. He later released the collections Etudes (2018) and Etudes II (2019), featuring piano compositions written in 2003 and 2005, respectively. In May 2020, he started a weekly Instagram livestream series titled Keep Up The Good Work, featuring interchanging guests such as Federman and Sedghi.

In 2012, Sedghi graduated from the University of Michigan with an undergraduate honors degree in neuroscience, later receiving a doctorate in osteopathic medicine at Touro University California in 2016. He now works as a family medicine doctor for Kaiser Permanente in Orange County, California. Sedghi is married with two children. Ross Federman has made occasional appearances as a producer, percussionist, and DJ under the pseudonym "Mr. F", although he has primarily focused on his education. He graduated from the University of Michigan in 2013 with a Bachelor of Science in cell and molecular biology, later receiving a Ph.D. in immunology from Yale University in May 2019.

Joe Hawley formed the project Miracle Musical (ミラクルミュージカル) with Federman and Karaca, releasing their debut single "Variations on a Cloud" with Cantor on September 11, 2012. The group released the concept album Hawaii: Part II on December 12, 2012, with Sedghi and Cantor appearing on the album's tracks "White Ball" and "Time Machine", respectively. Several songs from the album have since gained popularity on TikTok and other social media platforms. A collection of demos and samples titled Hawaii: Part II: Part ii and a cover of "Candle on the Water" were released in 2014 under the same name, followed by the 8-bit soundtrack album Hawaii Partii (2015) for the promotional game Labyrinth.

Vinyl single for "Just a Friend"

In 2015, Tally Hall released the compilation Admittedly Incomplete Demos on Bandcamp, referencing their earlier collection Complete Demos (2004). It includes demos, unreleased songs, live performances, and studio covers of "The Minstrel Boy" and "Just A Friend". The latter was re-released in August 2019 as a single and included as a bonus track on the 2021 re-issue of Marvin's Marvelous Mechanical Museum. In April 2022, 2 new demos were added: "Welcome to Tally Hall (Reprise) (Demo)" and "Hymn For a Scarecrow (Demo)".

Hawley released his debut solo album Joe Hawley Joe Hawley (2016) under his name on Bandcamp, individually featuring all five Tally Hall members alongside other artists. The album was later taken down due to copyright infringement. In response, he released a reversed version of the album titled γɘlwɒH ɘoႱ γɘlwɒH ɘoႱ on April 16, 2019. A truncated version of the original album was later uploaded to Apple Music and Spotify on November 11, 2020, removing the final track due to unresolved copyright issues: a cover version of Jefferson Airplane's "White Rabbit". In 2025 and 2026, Hawley released the solo singles "6:09", "Some People Eat Flowers out of Earnest Intent to Bring Heaven", and "Rubber Baby Buggy Bumpers".

In 2021, Needlejuice Records reissued Marvin's Marvelous Mechanical Museum on vinyl, CD, and cassette, releasing a MiniDisc in June to coincide with International MiniDisc Day. On August 26, 2022, pre-orders for a re-issue of Good & Evil went public alongside a 7" vinyl for "Turn the Lights Off" with the aforementioned track on the A side and "Light & Night" on the B side. After renewed online popularity, "The Bidding" received a Gold certification from the Recording Industry Association of America (RIAA), and on November 25, 2025, both "Hidden in the Sand" and "Turn the Lights Off" received RIAA certifications, earning Platinum (1,000,000 units) and Gold (500,000 units), respectively.

Following this renewed interest, discussion of the band reuniting frequently came up. However, following allegations of inappropriate conduct with fans made against Hawley in both 2020 and 2023, Horowitz stated otherwise on the band's behalf, citing Hawley's mental health as a primary reason for the band not returning, and urging fans to not contact him on social media.

...For years, we've watched our friend battle mental illness. We've done what we could to try and help, but it's beyond our control. This is the primary reason there's no third album or plans to tour. ...

— Andrew Horowitz, on behalf of Tally Hall

In 2024, Horowitz, along with Federman, Karaca and Illicit Ghost, performed at Sonic Lunch, a music festival in Ann Arbor. He began frequently opening for Jukebox the Ghost in 2025 to promote his upcoming studio album, with the same guests along with Cantor and Sedghi performing on other dates. That same year, Horowitz, Federman, Karaca and Illicit Ghost returned to Sonic Lunch, this time with Cantor and Casey Shea. On May 22, 2025, Horowitz released the lead single "MONSTERS" featuring Illicit Ghost. followed on July 24 by the single "Fishes" featuring Cantor, Sedghi, Karaca, and Shea. Both had been sold on cassette tapes at concerts before their official release. On February 16, 2026, Horowitz released the third single "Good Morning Mr. Butterfly" featuring Illicit Ghost. In June, Tally Hall posted to their YouTube community tab for the first time to advertise Cantor's single "My Boy", after 14 years of inactivity.

=== Reunion (2026–present) ===
On August 7, 2026, amidst another round of accusations involving Hawley, the remaining members released a statement through Tally Hall's X account, stating their plans to make music together again, but not in the band's original form, leaving the future of the band and Hawley's placement in it uncertain.

On September 25, the Tally Hall X account posted a phone number. They later put up humorous posters around Ann Arbor, featuring the phone number. On October 2, the band posted a video to their X, Facebook, and YouTube pages which featured various live clips of the band, alongside the phone number again and the date October 22.

On October 22, the band performed a reunion show at the Blind Pig, their first in over 15 years, with Casey Shea replacing Hawley for the performance, alongside longtime contributor Bora Karaca joining them as well. On October 26, they announced a six-date tour for spring 2027, with a seventh added in Los Angeles as well as expanded venues due to the overwhelming demand. The Tally Hall X account stated that they were "blown away" by the demand.

On November 11, Rob Cantor released his second solo album, Age of Athleisure, along with a single from the album, "Going Purple", released November 5.

== Videos ==
Before joining the band, Joe Hawley worked with the sketch comedy group AnonyMous. The group made several movies of humorous skits and music videos, the latter containing Tally Hall songs such as "Banana Man", which resulted in significant publicity on the website Albino Blacksheep.

In August 2008, the band performed a three-song live video set for LiveDaily Sessions, including the songs "Good Day", "Be Born", and "Greener", which premiered on August 28, 2008. They have appeared on Fearless Music several times, playing songs such as "Be Born", "Ruler of Everything", "Misery Fell", "Good Day", and "Banana Man".

In July 2014, band member Rob Cantor released a video in which he appeared to perform his song "Perfect" by singing impressions of 29 celebrities. In the video, Cantor is accompanied by Andrew Horowitz on piano and backing vocals. The video received more than 7,000,000 views in 10 days. Shortly thereafter, Cantor revealed the video to be an elaborate hoax.

=== Tally Hall's Internet Show and music videos ===
On September 15, 2008, the band debuted the ten-part bi-weekly variety-show series Tally Hall's Internet Show (T.H.I.S.). Each episode ran 8–11 minutes long and was posted on their website, tallyhall.com, YouTube, and Albino Blacksheep. The content primarily included comedy sketches and music videos. Content included a "honk war", Horowitz in a bathtub filled with spaghetti and a sketch about the band members asking Sedghi questions about natural ketchup. The first episode was titled after and featured a video for their single "Good Day", which was later released on YouTube. Other music videos created for the show include "Dream", "Welcome to Tally Hall", "Two Wuv", "The Whole World and You", "Greener", "Ruler of Everything", and "Hidden in the Sand". Videos for "Taken for a Ride" and "Turn the Lights Off" were additionally released outside of the show, with a music video for "&" being planned but abandoned before its release.

== Band members ==
=== Current members ===
- Rob Cantor (Yellow tie) – guitar, vocals, percussion, ukulele (2002–present)
- Zubin Sedghi (Blue tie) – bass, vocals (2002–present)
- Andrew Horowitz (Green tie) – keyboards, percussion, vocals (2002–present)
- Ross Federman (Grey tie) – drums, percussion, drum programming, occasional vocals (2004–present)

=== Past members ===
- Steve Gallagher (Grey tie) – drums, percussion (2003–2004)
- Joe Hawley (Red tie) - guitar, vocals, percussion, ukulele (2003–2026)

=== Additional touring members ===
- Casey Shea (Black tie) – guitar, vocals, percussion (2010, 2026–present)
- Bora Karaca (Orange tie) – guitar, keyboards, percussion, accordion, whistling, backing vocals (2011, 2026–present)

== Discography ==
- Marvin's Marvelous Mechanical Museum (2005)
- Good & Evil (2011)
