= Hidden in the Sand =

Song by Tally Hall

from the album Marvin's Marvelous Mechanical Museum
- Released: October 24, 2005
- Studio: Sterling Sound (New York)
- Length: 1:51, 1:53 (re-issue)
- Songwriter: Joe Hawley
- Producer: Tally Hall

Audio
- "Hidden in the Sand" on YouTube

Music video
- "Hidden in the Sand" on YouTube

"Hidden in the Sand" is a song by American rock band Tally Hall. It appears as a hidden track on the band's debut album, Marvin's Marvelous Mechanical Museum. It has become one of the band's more recognized songs following their hiatus, mainly due to its spread on social media sites such as TikTok.

== Background and composition ==
On May 14, 2004, Tally Hall released the EP Welcome To Tally Hall, featuring "Hidden in the Sand" as the fifth and hidden track. The demo is played acoustically with vocal harmonies provided by the band. Its origin EP and Tally Hall's previous EP Party Boobytrap were later combined into the compilation album Complete Demos. The track would be re-recorded for Marvin's Marvelous Mechanical Museum with an extended outro featuring Marvin's Marvelous Mechanical Museum's founder, Marvin Yagoda. "Hidden in the Sand" received a third revision with further vocal harmonies and effects after signing with Atlantic Records for the album's 2008 re-issue. The song is composed in 4/4 common time and in the key of F-sharp major, with a tempo of 121 beats per minute (bpm).

== Music video ==
A music video animated and directed by Steve Loter was released for "Hidden in the Sand" on January 19, 2009, as part of the final episode of Tally Hall's Internet Show. As of October 2026, the music video on YouTube has amassed over 57 million views.

== Commercial performance ==
In 2007, the episode "The Dream Lover" from the American television series The O.C. features "Hidden in the Sand". In a segment, Ché (portrayed by Chris Pratt) leads Seth (portrayed by Adam Brody) to dream about an otter spirit animal. In 2019, "Hidden in the Sand" became a viral song on the social media platform TikTok (most notably within the Five Nights at Freddy's fandom), with many using the song as a soundbite on the site. This helped it amass several hundred million streams on Spotify, becoming the band's highest-streamed song. It additionally received a Gold certification from the RIAA on July 12, 2023, and a Platinum certification on November 25, 2025.

== Personnel ==
Credits adapted from the album's liner notes. (Note: Although Ross Federman is a member of Tally Hall, he does not perform on this song.)

Tally Hall:
- Rob Cantor – backing vocals
- Joe Hawley – lead vocals, ukulele, songwriting
- Zubin Sedghi – backing vocals
- Andrew Horowitz – keyboards

Other Musicians:

- Chris Shaw – mixing engineer
- Greg Calbi - mastering
- Marvin Yagoda - spoken word

== Certifications ==
Certifications and sales for "Hidden in the Sand"
| Region | Certification | Certified units/sales |
|---|---|---|
| United States (RIAA) | Platinum | 1,000,000^{‡} |
^{‡} Sales+streaming figures based on certification alone.
