= Rob Cantor =

American singer-songwriter (born 1983)

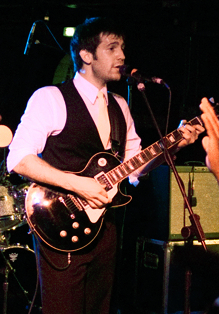
- Cantor performing with Tally Hall in 2008

Background information
- Born: Robert Howard Cantor; August 26, 1983 (age 43); Bloomfield Hills, Michigan, US
- Genres: Alternative rock; indie pop; comedy; novelty; children's music
- Occupations: Musician; singer-songwriter
- Instruments: Vocals; guitar
- Years active: 2002–present
- Label: Tabor Corn Inc.
- Member of: Tally Hall
- Website: robcantor.com

YouTube information
- Channel: robcantor
- Subscribers: 341 thousand
- Views: 137 million
- Last updated: 25 October 2026

Robert Howard Cantor (born August 26, 1983) is an American singer-songwriter and creator of multiple viral videos. He is the guitarist, a vocalist, and co-writer for the indie rock band Tally Hall.

In addition, Cantor is also known for his solo work as a comedy musician and viral video creator, particularly from the viral comedy song "Shia LaBeouf", in which actor Shia LaBeouf is depicted as a cannibalistic serial killer. His other work has included a solo album titled Not a Trampoline (2014), and another viral video, "29 Celebrity Impressions, 1 Original Song".

== Early life ==
Cantor was born and raised in Bloomfield Hills, Michigan, the son of David Mark Cantor and Marion Catherine "Cathy" (née Hoff). His father is an OB-GYN. Cantor is Jewish; he had his bar mitzvah at Temple Israel in West Bloomfield Township, Michigan.

In 2002, Cantor, Zubin Sedghi, and Zach Krasman formed the band listedBlack. They made the EP Songs About Girls, and disbanded the same year. Later in 2002, while attending University of Michigan, he formed Tally Hall with bassist Zubin Sedghi, drummer Steve Gallagher and keyboardist Andrew Horowitz, with guitarist Joe Hawley joining soon after. He majored in molecular biology, with a minor in nonprofessional music. He graduated in 2005, and turned down a full scholarship to medical school in order to pursue music full-time with Tally Hall.

== Career ==
=== 2002–2012: Tally Hall and related work ===
Between 2002 and 2011, Cantor performed as a guitarist and vocalist of the Michigan-based band Tally Hall. The band's five members are distinguished by the color of their neckties, with Cantor's signature color being yellow.

Cantor's career as a member of Tally Hall saw the release of two full-length albums: Marvin's Marvelous Mechanical Museum (2005), and Good & Evil (2011). The band also released one full demo album, titled Complete Demos (2004). "The Bidding", which Cantor co-provided lead vocals for, was certified gold by the RIAA on July 12, 2023, along with the band's song "Hidden in the Sand".

In 2012, Cantor would make contributions to the musical project ミラクルミュージカル, spearheaded by Joe Hawley of Tally Hall. He performed vocals alongside Hawley for both the single "Variations on a Cloud," released on September 11, 2012, and for the track "Time Machine" from the album Hawaii: Part II, released on December 12 of the same year.

=== 2013–2014: Viral videos and Not a Trampoline ===
Since 2011, Cantor has worked on multiple viral projects, including songs and corresponding viral videos, posted on his SoundCloud and YouTube pages. In 2012, he released the comedy songs "Christian Bale Is at Your Party" and "Shia LaBeouf" (also known as "Actual Cannibal Shia LaBeouf"). In the latter, Cantor narrates a story about the actor Shia LaBeouf as a cannibalistic serial killer. Cantor posted a demo of the song to his SoundCloud page, from which it spread virally.

On July 1, 2014, Cantor posted a YouTube video titled "29 Celebrity Impressions, 1 Original Song", in which he and Horowitz performed Cantor's song "Perfect" in 29 different celebrity impressions. A week later, he released a making-of video, demonstrating that the act was a hoax done through audio and video editing with 11 different impressionists dubbing over his voice.

On October 21, 2014, Cantor posted a video titled "'Shia LaBeouf' – Live", the music video to his 2012 song of the same name. The video is a mockup of a live performance, featuring numerous dancers and performers, primarily the Gay Men's Chorus of Los Angeles, the West Los Angeles Children's Choir, and the Argus Quartet. At the end of the video, the actor Shia LaBeouf is seen applauding the performance, in a parody of a scene from Citizen Kane. Cantor has stated that the video took four months to organize and one day to shoot, and that it was worked on by 161 people, including Cantor's former musical collaborators Zubin Sedghi, Bora Karaca and Zach Krasman. The video was nominated for best "Individual Short or Episode (Online Film & Video)" at the 19th Annual Webby Awards and won.

During Tally Hall's hiatus, Cantor has focused on his solo career, working as a commercial songwriter and eventually releasing a solo album, Not a Trampoline, in 2014.

=== 2015–present: Work with Disney and reduced output ===
Cantor later worked with Intel in 2016 in a promotion for True Key. In recent years, Cantor has done work with several Disney TVA properties – contributing to the soundtracks of multiple shows, including Disney Junior's T.O.T.S. and Disney Channel's The Ghost and Molly McGee. He frequently partners with Genevieve Goings in producing Disney-affiliated nursery rhymes, lullabies, and other simple children's songs, and The Ghost and Molly McGee features one-minute Cantor originals once per each episode. Cantor also contributed the song "I Stand by Your Side" to the soundtrack of 2023 film River Wild. In 2025, Cantor re-released Not a Trampoline featuring a re-recorded bonus track on vinyl and CD. The re-release was promoted by an Instagram livestream and an AMA on the Tally Hall subreddit. On June 16, 2026, Cantor released a new single titled "My Boy", announced to be part of a new album. The song was promoted with a music video uploaded online.

Tally Hall reunited for their first show in 15 years on October 22, 2026, at the Blind Pig in Ann Arbor, with Cantor performing alongside members Zubin Sedghi, Andrew Horowitz, Ross Federman and touring musicians Bora Karaca and Casey Shea. The band will hold a six-performance reunion tour in 2027.

In November 2026 he announced a new album, Age of Athleisure, which released on November 11 along with a single from the album, "Going Purple", released a few days earlier.

== Selected discography ==
=== Tally Hall ===
- Marvin's Marvelous Mechanical Museum (2005)
- Good & Evil (2011)

=== Solo ===
Studio albums

- Not a Trampoline (2014)
- Age of Athleisure (2026)

Singles

- "Christian Bale is at Your Party" (2012)
- "Shia LaBeouf" (2012)
- "Old Bike" (2014)
- "Ghost" (2014)
- "All I Need Is You" (2014)
- "My Boy" (2026)
- "Going Purple" (2026)
