= Marvin's Marvelous Mechanical Museum (album) =

2005 studio album by Tally Hall

- 2005 and 2006 release cover art

Studio album by Tally Hall
- Released: October 24, 2005 (Original release); September 12, 2006 (Reissue); April 1, 2008 (Atlantic re-release)
- Recorded: June–October 2005; May–June 2007 (2008 reissue)
- Studios: 40 Oz. Sound, Ann Arbor; Stratosphere Sound, New York City
- Genres: Alternative rock; indie rock; power pop; baroque pop; garage rock; psychedelic rock; rap rock
- Length: 49:10
- Label: Quack! Media
- Producer: Tally Hall

Tally Hall chronology
The Pingry EP (2005)	Marvin's Marvelous Mechanical Museum (2005)	Good & Evil (2011)

Alternate cover
- 2008 re-release cover art

Singles from Marvin's Marvelous Mechanical Museum
- 1. "Good Day" Released: 2005 (Promo)

Singles from Marvin's Marvelous Mechanical Museum (Atlantic Records reissue)
- 1. "Good Day" Released: February 26, 2008; 2. "Welcome to Tally Hall" Released: 2008 (Promo)

Professional ratings
Review scores
Source	Rating
AllMusic	4/5 stars

Marvin's Marvelous Mechanical Museum is the debut studio album by American rock band Tally Hall, originally released on October 24, 2005, and was re-released in 2006 under Quack! Media and re-recorded in 2008 with Atlantic Records.

The album received generally positive reviews and became a word-of-mouth success, however the album had little commercial success despite heavy promotion. Needlejuice Records re-released the album in 2021.

== Background ==
Tally Hall was formed in 2002. Their previous recordings were all independently produced and distributed demos. All of the tracks on the album are finished versions of their demo tracks featured in Party Boobytrap E.P., and the Welcome to Tally Hall E.P., with the exception of "Haiku," which is a completely new song. The album gets its name from a museum of mechanized curiosities then located in Farmington Hills, Michigan. The album's cover art is also based on a number of machines located within the museum.

== Reissues and re-releases ==
The album was officially re-released on September 12, 2006, under the Quack! Media label. This re-release coincided with additional publicity on MTV, national distribution in all major retail stores, and various other TV appearances including The Late Late Show with Craig Ferguson. The song "The Whole World and You" would be used in an ad for Crayola. The music video for "Good Day" was first shown at Tally Hall's two Ann Arbor concerts on September 23, 2006.

Tally Hall was later signed with Atlantic Records, and was approved to re-record Marvin's Marvelous Mechanical Museum at Stratosphere Sound Recording Studios in NYC. The remastered version of the album was released in April 2008, with "Good Day" and "Welcome to Tally Hall" released as promotional singles. In 2021, it was re-released again, under Needlejuice Records.

== "Good Day" ==
The single "Good Day" from the new version of the album was released on February 26, 2008. The re-recorded version of the album was released on April 1, 2008. This release also included a vinyl LP pressing of the album. It was reissued on vinyl, cassette, and CD by Needlejuice Records on March 13, 2021.

"Good Day" was written by Andrew Horowitz and won a prize of $10,000 with the 2004 BMI John Lennon Scholarship for "the best and brightest young songwriters between the ages of 15 and 24".

The song was featured on The Late, Late Show with Craig Ferguson. The song was also featured in the April 6, 2006, episode of The O.C., a prime-time drama series. A simlish version of "Good Day" was created for use in The Sims 2. This version of "Good Day" was later featured as a new hidden track on the pregap of the Needlejuice Records CD re-release of Marvin's Marvelous Mechanical Museum.

== Track listing ==
Track lengths are per the 2005 release. The 2008 versions differ in up to 19 seconds in length.

All tracks are written by Rob Cantor, Joe Hawley, Andrew Horowitz, and Zubin Sedghi (respectively, as denoted).

No.	Title	Writer(s)	Lead vocals	Length
1.	"Good Day"	Horowitz	Hawley, Cantor, Sedghi	3:24
2.	"Greener"	Cantor	Cantor	3:42
3.	"Welcome to Tally Hall"	Hawley (music & lyrics), Cantor, Sedghi (lyrics)	Cantor, Sedghi, Hawley	5:04
4.	"Taken for a Ride"	Horowitz	Horowitz, Hawley	4:40
5.	"The Bidding"	Hawley	Hawley, Cantor, Sedghi	2:29
6.	"Be Born"	Cantor	Cantor	3:09
7.	"Banana Man"	Hawley	Hawley	4:08
8.	"Just Apathy"	Cantor	Cantor	3:12
9.	"Spring and a Storm"	Hawley	Hawley	4:43
10.	"Two Wuv"	Horowitz	Sedghi	3:41
11.	"Haiku"	Cantor	Cantor, Hawley	2:57
12.	"The Whole World and You"	Horowitz	Horowitz	1:44
13.	"13"	Hawley	instrumental	0:13
14.	"Ruler of Everything"	Hawley	Hawley, Sedghi	4:13
15.	"Hidden in the Sand" (hidden track)	Hawley	Hawley	1:51
Total length:				49:21

iTunes bonus tracks
No.	Title	Writer(s)	Lead vocals	Length
16.	"Mucka Blucka"	Hawley	Federman	1:38
17.	"Dream"	Horowitz	instrumental	1:49
Total length:				53:33

Needlejuice reissue bonus tracks
No.	Title	Writer(s)	Lead vocals	Length
0.	"Good Day Simlish" (Pregap bonus track)	Horowitz	Hawley, Cantor, Sedghi	3:32
18.	"Just a Friend"	Biz Markie	Cantor, Sedghi	4:30
Total length:				61:35

=== Notes ===
- On vinyl & cassette releases of the album, "The Whole World and You" is track 7. "The Whole World and You" is the last of side A on the vinyl, rather than track 12, and on cassette editions, "Banana Man" is the last track of side A.

== Personnel ==
=== Tally Hall ===
- Rob Cantor – vocals, guitar, ukulele (12), percussion
- Joe Hawley – vocals, guitar, ukulele (9, 15), melodica (7)
- Zubin Sedghi – bass, vocals
- Andrew Horowitz – keyboards, percussion, vocals
- Ross Federman – drums, percussion, marimba (11), vocals (16), auctioneer voice (5)

=== Other musicians ===
- Alison Kartush – backing vocals (4, 12)
- Andrew Papas – backing vocals (4, 12)
- Ashley Hurst – backing vocals (4, 12)
- Bora Karaca – backing vocals (1, 5, 7), whistling (7)
- Brett Trzcinski – backing vocals (1, 5, 7)
- Caitlyn Thomson – backing vocals (4, 12)
- Claire Smith – backing vocals (4, 12)
- Donald Milton III – backing vocals (1, 5, 7)
- Emily Barkin – backing vocals (4, 12)
- Greg Jaffe – backing vocals (1, 5, 7)
- Jason Ceo – backing vocals (1, 5, 7)
- Jessica Fetter – backing vocals (4, 12)
- Jon Zande – backing vocals (1, 5, 7)
- Karl Pestka – backing vocals (4, 12)
- Lisa Bakale-Wise – backing vocals (4, 12)
- Michael Anuzis – backing vocals (4, 12)
- Michael Steelman – backing vocals (1, 5, 7)
- Rebecca Blinder – backing vocals (4, 12)
- Stephanie Fajuri – backing vocals (4, 12)
- Tim Wagner – backing vocals (1, 5, 7)
- Victor Szabo – backing vocals (1, 5, 7)
- Jim Roll – banjo (6)
- Keith Reed – double bass (4, 6, 9, 12)
- Anna Schultz – cello (3, 4, 9, 13, 14)
- Rachel Hsieh – cello (3, 8, 13, 14)
- Andres Ivan Navedo – clarinet (12)
- Brittni Troy – French horn (4, 9)
- Eric Brummitt – French horn (4, 9)
- Ben Began – mandolin (14)
- Bobby Streng – saxophone (3, 4)
- Melissa Gardiner – trombone (3, 4, 12)
- Steve Peterson – trombone (5, 7)
- David Tenerelli – trumpet (4, 5, 7)
- Jeff Blim – trumpet (3, 12)
- Matt Lyon – tuba (5, 7)
- Michael Nickens – tuba (3, 4, 12)
- Laurel Borden – viola (3, 4, 9, 13, 14)
- Jeremy Kittel – violin (6)
- Shawn Jaeger – violin (3, 4, 9, 13, 14)
- Marvin Yagoda – voice (3, 15)
- The Haiku Dinner Party – crowd (11)
- Roberta Tamm – kid voice (9)
- Taylor Janssen – kid voice (9)

=== Technical personnel ===
- Patrick Fong – art direction, design
- Zubin Sedghi – artwork
- Court Jones – artwork [cover]
- Joe Hawley – artwork [direction, design]
- Austin Ash Lemon – artwork [back cover layout, 2021]
- Ben Began – engineer
- Bora Karaca – engineer [assistant]
- Rudyard Lee Cullers – engineer [digital assembly]
- Jennifer Tzar – photography
- Tally Hall – producer
