= Good & Evil (album) =

2011 studio album by Tally Hall

Studio album by Tally Hall
- Released: June 21, 2011
- Recorded: October 26 – November 26, 2009
- Studios: Sunset Sound Factory, California
- Genres: Alternative rock, indie pop, progressive pop, power pop, psychedelic rock
- Length: 48:50
- Label: Quack! Media
- Producer: Tony Hoffer

Tally Hall chronology
Marvin's Marvelous Mechanical Museum (2005)	Good & Evil (2011)	Admittedly Incomplete Demos (2015)

Singles from Good & Evil
- 1. "You & Me" Released: May 2, 2011; 2. "&" Released: June 20, 2011; 3. "Turn the Lights Off" Released: August 26, 2022

Good & Evil is the second studio album by American rock band Tally Hall, released on June 21, 2011, by Quack! Media. Originally planned to be released under Atlantic Records, the album ended up being released under their original label due to unknown circumstances. It has since been reissued on vinyl, CD, cassette, and minidisc by Needlejuice Records.

== Production ==
In late April 2009, the band posted a scheduled event on their Facebook page entitled "Tally Hall May Tour", with a subtitle of "The Last Pre-Recording Hurrah". It stated that, after a number of shows in May, they would begin recording their second album.

On October 19, 2009, Tally Hall began pre-production on the album. October 26, 2009 marked the first official day of recording at The Sunset Sound Factory, with producer Tony Hoffer and engineer Todd Burke. Through Ross Federman's Twitter, it was revealed that they were recording 16 tracks; however, the album was announced to have 14 instead.

On November 26, 2009 (Thanksgiving Day), the band announced via Twitter that they had completed tracking, leaving them one day to prepare for their tour with Rooney and Crash Kings.

On May 2, 2011, the band released their first single off the album, "You & Me", on the music webzine Consequence of Sound. The following day, the single was officially released on iTunes.

On June 20, 2011, the band released the track "&" via their YouTube account.

The album was also released on CD, vinyl, cassette, minidisc, and digital download.

== Track listing ==
All tracks are written by Rob Cantor, Joe Hawley, Andrew Horowitz, and Zubin Sedghi (respectively, as denoted).

Good & Evil
No.	Title	Writer(s)	Lead vocals	Length
1.	"Never Meant to Know"	Cantor	Cantor	3:40
2.	"&"	Hawley	Hawley	3:14
3.	"You & Me"	Cantor	Cantor	2:52
4.	"Cannibal"	Sedghi	Sedghi	3:28
5.	"Who You Are"	Cantor	Cantor	3:40
6.	"Sacred Beast"	Hawley	Hawley, Sedghi, Cantor	2:22
7.	"Hymn for a Scarecrow"	Hawley	Hawley	4:50
8.	"A Lady"	Hawley	Hawley	1:05
9.	"The Trap"	Sedghi	Sedghi	4:31
10.	"Turn the Lights Off"	Hawley	Hawley, Sedghi, Cantor	2:56
11.	"Misery Fell"	Horowitz	Sedghi	3:34
12.	"Out in the Twilight"	Cantor	Cantor	2:51
13.	"You"	Horowitz	Horowitz	2:57
14.	"Fate of the Stars"	Horowitz	Hawley, Cantor, Sedghi, Horowitz	6:50
Total length:				48:50

Needlejuice reissue bonus tracks
No.	Title	Writer(s)	Lead vocals	Length
0.	"Light & Night" (Pregap bonus track)	Cantor, Federman, Horowitz, Sedghi	Cantor, Nellie McKay	4:19
Total length:				53:09

== Personnel ==
=== Tally Hall ===
- Rob Cantor - guitars, vocals, sequencer on "Never Meant to Know", piano on "You & Me"
- Joe Hawley - guitars, vocals, percussion, ocarina on "Sacred Beast"
- Zubin Sedghi - bass guitar, vocals
- Andrew Horowitz - keyboards, vocals
- Ross Federman - drums, percussion, drum programming, backing vocals on "Hymn for a Scarecrow" and "Turn the Lights Off"

=== Additional musicians ===
- Bora Karaca - whistling on "Hymn for a Scarecrow", backing vocals on "Turn the Lights Off"
- Nellie McKay - co-lead vocals on "Light & Night"

=== Technical personnel ===
- Tony Hoffer - producer and mixer
- Todd Burke - recording
- Wren Rider - studio tech
- Dave Cooley - mastering
- Joe Hawley - art direction & design
