= First Impressions (game show) =

American television game show

- Genre: Game show
- Presented by: Dana Carvey; Freddie Prinze Jr.
- Country of origin: United States
- Original language: English
- No. of seasons: 1
- No. of episodes: 6

Production
- Executive producers: Dana Carvey; Jeff Gaspin; David Garfinkle; Jay Renfroe
- Running time: 22 minutes
- Production companies: Renegade 83; Gaspin Media; Dana Carvey Enterprises

Original release
- Network: USA Network
- Release: May 10 – June 14, 2016

First Impressions is an American television game show hosted by Dana Carvey and Freddie Prinze Jr. The series premiered on USA Network on May 10, 2016, and concluded on June 14, 2016.

== Episodes ==
No.	Title	Original release date	U.S. viewers (millions)
1	"Steve Carell"	May 10, 2016	0.734
2	"Jon Lovitz"	May 17, 2016	0.677
3	"Kevin Nealon"	May 24, 2016	0.454
4	"Kate Flannery"	May 31, 2016	0.516
5	"Yvette Nicole Brown"	June 7, 2016	0.550
6	"Tom Arnold"	June 14, 2016	0.502
