= The Magician's Elephant =

2009 novel by Kate DiCamillo

- First edition
- Author: Kate DiCamillo
- Illustrator: Yoko Tanaka
- Cover artist: Yoko Tanaka
- Language: English
- Subject: Children's fiction
- Genre: Children's novel
- Published: September 8, 2009
- Publisher: Candlewick Press
- Publication place: United States
- Media type: Hardcover
- Pages: 208
- ISBN: 978-0-7636-4410-9
- Preceded by: Mercy Watson: Something Wonky this Way Comes

The Magician's Elephant is a children's novel by American author Kate DiCamillo. It was released on September 8, 2009, and illustrated by Yoko Tanaka.

== Synopsis ==
Orphan Peter Augustus Duchene has one question for the fortuneteller: If his sister is still alive, how can he find her? The answer is unexpected: Follow the elephant. Unbelievable? Perhaps. But true.

== "Light & Night" ==
As part of the book's promotion, Candlewick commissioned a song from the indie band Tally Hall and singer-songwriter Nellie McKay. The song, called "Light & Night", was included as a download code with copies of the book purchased at Walmart stores. In 2022, Needlejuice Records rereleased "Light & Night" on the B-side of a vinyl single of "Turn The Lights Off", to accompany their reissue of Good & Evil.

== Characters ==
- Peter Augustus Duchene is an orphan boy being trained to become a soldier by his guardian, Vilna Lutz. He promised his mother he would take care of his sister, and is smart, caring and kind. He believes that an elephant prophesied by a fortune teller will lead him to his sister.
- Vilna Lutz is a soldier who was Peter's father's friend. He is Peter's guardian and tells him that his sister is dead. He also trains Peter to be a soldier.
- Adele is Peter's younger long-lost six-year-old sister. Her mother dies right after she is born. She grows up not knowing her brother and living at an orphanage, where she dreams about an elephant coming to get her there.
- The Magician made the elephant appear from the ceiling, though he claims he only intended lilies. He goes to prison for handicapping Madam LaVaughn with his elephant.
- Leo Matienne is a police officer and lives in the apartment below Vilna Lutz's apartment. He lives with his wife, Gloria, and although he is unable to have any children of his own, he ends up adopting Peter and Adele.
- Madam LaVaughn is a woman whose legs are broken by the elephant which is summoned by the magician. She eventually forgives him.
- Hans Eckman is Madam LaVaughn's manservant. He recalls having a dog that could jump across a river, but cannot remember the name.
- Tomas is a beggar who owns the blind dog, Iddo. He is known for his singing.
- Bartok Wynn used to sculpt gargoyles until he fell off, which made him hunch over. He has a spontaneous tendency to laugh, and he works as the caretaker for the elephant.

== Adaptations ==
=== Stage adaptation ===
A stage musical version by Nancy Harris and Marc Teitler made its debut at the Royal Shakespeare Company during their winter 2021 season. The US premiere of the musical took place at Hale Center Theatre in Sandy, Utah during their 2024 season.

=== Film adaptation ===
It was reported in 2009 that Fox planned to adapt The Magician's Elephant into a film to be produced by Julia Pistor. On December 15, 2020, Netflix acquired the rights for an animated feature film adaptation of the book, with Wendy Rogers set to direct it and Julia Pistor set to produce it. On the same day, Netflix also announced Noah Jupe, Benedict Wong, Pixie Davies, Sian Clifford, Brian Tyree Henry, Mandy Patinkin, Natasia Demetriou, Dawn French, Aasif Mandvi, Miranda Richardson, and Kirby Howell-Baptiste had joined the cast of the film.
