= Shia LaBeouf (song) =

2012 song

Song by Rob Cantor
- Written: 2011
- Released: March 3, 2012
- Songwriter: Rob Cantor

Music video
- "Shia LaBeouf" on YouTube

"Shia LaBeouf" is a 2012 song by Los Angeles-based singer-songwriter Rob Cantor that portrays Hollywood actor Shia LaBeouf as a cannibal. In 2014, Cantor released an expanded music video with a cameo from LaBeouf himself.

== Development ==
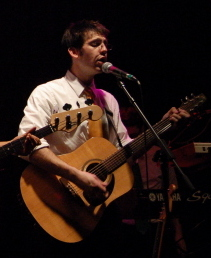
Cantor in 2006

Inspired by his friend, Andrew Laurich, repeatedly and dramatically whispering "Shia LaBeouf", Cantor wrote this song in 2011, driven by "nothing but the sheer silliness of imagining Shia LaBeouf, face and clothes smeared with half-dried blood, terrorizing helpless victims in a dark wood." The song describes an encounter and battle with LaBeouf, portrayed as an "actual cannibal" who lives in a forest and hunts people for sport. After writing the song, Cantor had hoped Funny or Die would be interested in using it in a video featuring the actor, but that arrangement never materialized.

On March 3, 2012, Cantor posted "Shia LaBeouf" to his SoundCloud page, from where one of his fans found and shared it on Twitter. By May that year, both Boing Boing and BuzzFeed had featured the song, though the eponymous actor had not publicly commented on the work, which was selling at Cantor's site for US$1.

== Music video ==
"Shia LaBeouf" Live
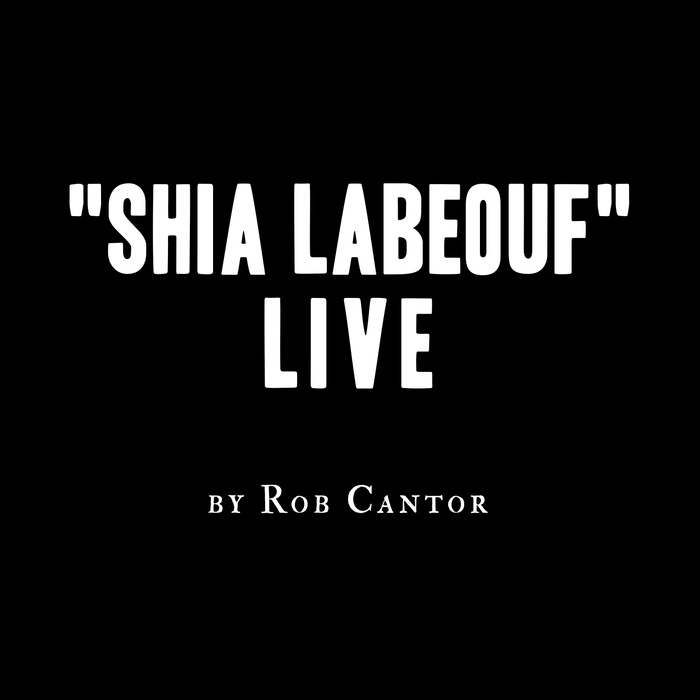
- Album cover for 2014's extended version, as published by Cantor at Bandcamp
- Directed by: Scott Uhlfelder
- Written by: Rob Cantor
- Based on: "Shia LaBeouf" by Rob Cantor
- Music by: Rob Cantor; Greg Nicolett
- Release date: October 21, 2014
- Running time: 3:27 minutes
- Budget: US$20,000 (eq. $27,000 in 2025)

On October 21, 2014, Cantor released a music video for an extended version of "Shia LaBeouf", in which he and an ensemble of artists perform the song on stage. LaBeouf makes a cameo at the end as the only audience member, and gives them a standing ovation.

=== Production ===
Having worked with him previously, Cantor first approached cinematographer Scott Uhfelder in April 2014 about making a "Shia LaBeouf" music video. The two of them developed the idea of "doing a classical orchestral performance that would constantly grow as the song progressed." Uhlfelder served as the video's director and cinematographer. The stage performance took four months to plan.

For the expanded version of the song, Greg Nicolett wrote the symphonic arrangement. He convinced Cantor to reduce a planned 50-piece orchestra to a string quartet not only for reduced costs, but the latter would increase the pretentiousness and therefore the absurdity in comparison to the subject matter.

Cantor's original budget was $12,000 (equivalent to $16,320 in 2025), provided by Maker Studios. When the production team continued "having more good ideas that we wanted to bring to fruition" like the aerialists and LaBeouf himself, Cantor provided the remaining $8,000 (equivalent to $10,880 in 2025). Cantor recruited 161 further artists, including the Argus Quartet, the West Los Angeles Children's Choir, the Gay Men's Chorus of Los Angeles, interpretive dancers, and stage effects by Kinetic Theory. Stacy Tookey choreographed the dancing troupe in the short film; she and her dancers were only able to begin rehearsing three days before the shoot. The aerialists were brought on board with only two days before filming.

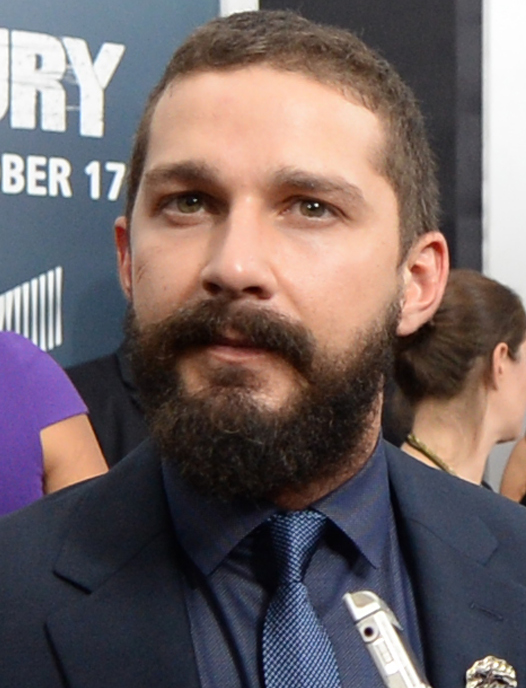
LaBeouf in 2014

Cantor already knew LaBeouf was aware of the original song because the actor had tweeted the link on Halloween 2013. The songwriter contacted the actor's talent manager and laid out his plan for LaBeouf to be the only audience member for the production; LaBeouf agreed to the proposition in less than two days.

The Redondo Beach Performing Arts Center was "the nicest theater [Cantor] could afford". Because the space was only available to the group on the day of shooting, none of the disparate performers were able to rehearse together until the 12-hour day of shooting began in October. Artists began arriving at 6 a.m. The entire music video was never shot as one continuous performance, but was instead broken up into five segments, the first of which began at 9 a.m. for cameras. LaBeouf's cameo was the last part filmed. Given the many difficulties and challenges, Uhlfelder later praised all the performers, saying, "all of the performers were extremely professional and the day went off with out a hitch."

The video was shot on three Canon EOS C300s using Canon L lenses, which allowed operators "to pull their own focus, or quickly reposition to get another shot." LaBeouf's cameo was the last part filmed: he was lit to evoke the clapping scene from Citizen Kane (LaBeouf's own idea), and his was the only audio captured on set that day.

=== Reception ===
The Los Angeles Times reported that the video—filmed at the Redondo Beach Performing Arts Center—was inspired by then-contemporary incidents where LaBeouf had behaved strangely in public, however Cantor later told MTV that he just felt that "Halloween was the right time" to fulfill his dream of making the video. Of the juxtaposition of 3D papercraft LaBeouf heads—created by Eric Testroete, and which took 80 man-hours to assemble, professional performers in classical arts, and his absurd song about a cannibalistic Hollywood star, Cantor called the production bathos.

The Huffington Post called the production "more ridiculous than ever" and especially impressive given the limitations involved; they opined that the attention given to this release could serve to reinvigorate LaBeouf's celebrity. Five years after its premiere, the video had garnered 63.8 million views on YouTube; as of October 2026, that number was greater than 91 million.
