= Natalie Imbruglia discography =

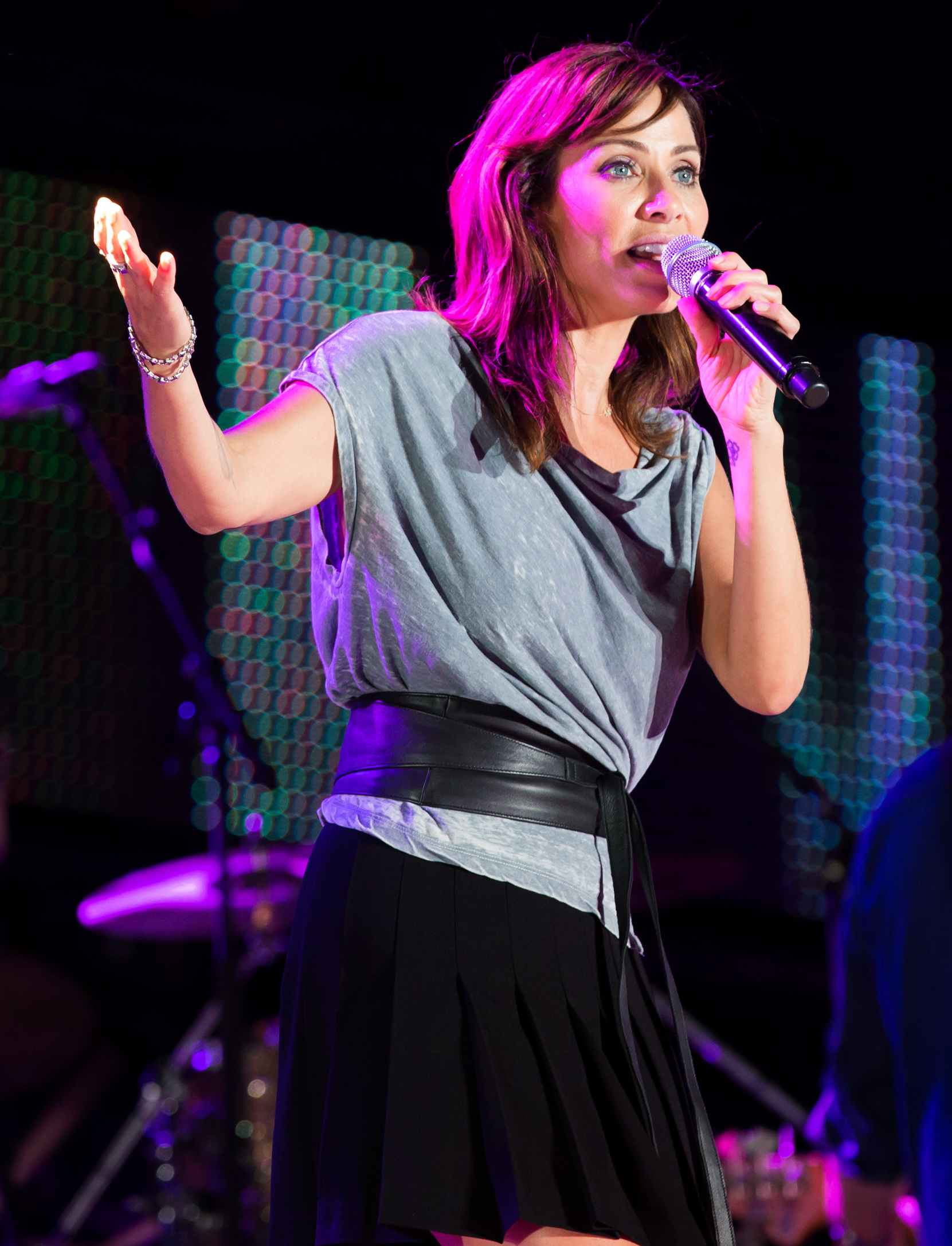
- Imbruglia performing in Austria in 2015
- Studio albums: 7
- Extended plays: 1
- Compilation albums: 1
- Singles: 21
- Music videos: 19
- Other appearances: 8

The discography of Natalie Imbruglia, an Australian pop singer, consists of seven studio albums, one compilation album, one extended play, and twenty-one singles. Imbruglia debuted in 1992 as an actress on the Australian soap opera Neighbours. In 1996, she began composing songs and signed a recording contract with RCA Records in the United Kingdom.

Imbruglia's debut album Left of the Middle was released in November 1997. The album reached number one on Australian albums chart and was certified platinum five times by the Australian Recording Industry Association (ARIA). On the UK albums chart, it reached number five and was certified triple platinum by the British Phonographic Industry (BPI). Left of the Middle sold over seven million copies and produced three top five singles. Her second album, White Lilies Island, was released in November 2001. It reached number three in Australia and was certified gold. The album reached number fifteen in the UK and was certified gold. White Lilies Island produced three singles, two of which reached the top forty in Australia. Counting Down the Days, her third album, was released in April 2005. It reached number twelve in Australia and number one in the UK. It produced two singles and was certified gold in the UK. Glorious: The Singles 97–07, a greatest hits collection, was released in September 2007. It reached number five in the UK and was certified gold. Since 1997, Imbruglia has sold over 10 million albums worldwide.

== Albums ==
=== Studio albums ===
List of studio albums, with selected chart positions, sales figures and certifications
Title	Details	Peak chart positions										Sales	Certifications (sales thresholds)
Title	Details	AUS	AUT	CAN	FRA	GER	ITA	NLD	SWI	UK	US	Sales	Certifications (sales thresholds)
Left of the Middle	Released: 7 November 1997; Label: RCA; Formats: CD, digital download, CS, vinyl	1	11	9	14	4	2	2	3	5	10	WW: 7,000,000; US: 2,000,000; UK: 1,143,800	ARIA: 5× Platinum; BPI: 3× Platinum; IFPI SWI: Platinum; MC: 3× Platinum; NVPI: Gold; RIAA: 2× Platinum; SNEP: Gold
White Lilies Island	Released: 5 November 2001; Label: RCA; Formats: CD, digital download	3	59	37	43	49	21	—	23	15	35	WW: 1,000,000	ARIA: Gold; BPI: Gold
Counting Down the Days	Released: 4 April 2005; Label: Brightside; Formats: CD, digital download	12	35	96	22	35	10	50	9	1	—	UK: 206,860; FRA: 38,000	BPI: Gold
Come to Life	Released: 5 October 2009; Label: Malabar/Island; Formats: CD, digital download	67	—	—	—	—	34	—	70	—	—		
Male	Released: 31 July 2015; Label: Portrait; Formats: CD, digital download, vinyl	25	—	—	—	97	—	—	50	20	—		
Firebird	Released: 24 September 2021; Label: BMG; Formats: CD, digital download, streaming, vinyl	30	—	—	—	—	—	—	69	10	—		
Algorithm	Released: 4 September 2026; Label: Landgirl Records; Formats: CD, digital download, streaming, vinyl	81	—	—	—	—	—	—	—	22	—		
"—" denotes releases that did not chart or were not released in that country.

=== Live albums ===
List of live albums, with selected chart positions,
Title	Details	Peak chart positions
Title	Details	UK Sales
London – Live	Released: 22 November 2024; Label: Demon Music Limited; Format: CD, LP, digital download	34

=== Compilation albums ===
List of compilation albums, with selected chart positions, sales figures and certifications
Title	Details	Peak chart positions			Cerfications
Title	Details	AUS	SWI	UK	Cerfications
Glorious: The Singles 97–07	Released: 10 September 2007; Label: Brightside; Formats: CD, CD/DVD, digital download	40	28	5	BPI: Gold

== Extended plays ==
List of extended plays with relevant details
Title	Details
Live from London (Note: Released exclusively through iTunes.)	Released: 17 August 2007; Label: Brightside; Format: Digital download

== Singles ==
List of singles, with selected chart positions and certifications, showing year released and album name
Year	Title	Peak chart positions										Certifications	Album
Year	Title	AUS	FRA	GER	ITA	NLD	NZ	SWE	SWI	UK	US	Certifications	Album
1997	"Torn"	2	4	4	2	3	5	1	2	2	42 (Note: "Torn" topped the Hot 100 Airplay chart for 11 weeks, but was not eligible for the Hot 100 at the time of its peak as Billboard did not allow album cuts (without a respective single release) to chart. After chart policy was revised to allow album cuts to chart as long as they were ranked in the Hot 100 Airplay chart (after a string of songs topped the chart but did not chart at all on the Hot 100), "Torn" was eligible for the Hot 100, in its last two weeks of life, thus its highest position was number 42, as it was at the end of a healthy chart run on the airplay charts.)	ARIA: Platinum; BPI: 4× Platinum; BVMI: Gold; FIMI: Platinum; IFPI SWE: Platinum; IFPI SWI: Gold; NVPI: Gold; SNEP: Gold	Left of the Middle
1998	"Big Mistake"	6	—	—	6	43	19	24	—	2	—	ARIA: Gold; BPI: Silver	Left of the Middle
1998	"Wishing I Was There"	24	56	68	—	77	40	—	—	19	—		Left of the Middle
1998	"Smoke"	42	—	—	—	—	—	—	—	5	—		Left of the Middle
1999	"Identify"	—	—	—	—	—	—	—	—	—	—		Stigmata soundtrack
2001	"That Day"	10	—	—	14	87	—	34	75	11	—		White Lilies Island
2002	"Wrong Impression"	33	90	—	25	83	10	—	41	10	64		White Lilies Island
2002	"Beauty on the Fire"	78	—	—	21	—	—	—	—	26	—		White Lilies Island
2005	"Shiver"	19	34	52	6	64	—	—	36	8	—		Counting Down the Days
2005	"Counting Down the Days"	52	—	—	25	—	—	—	90	23	—		Counting Down the Days
2007	"Glorious"	—	—	—	13	—	—	—	92	23	—		Glorious: The Singles 97–07
2009	"Want"	142	—	—	6	—	—	—	—	88	—		Come to Life
2015	"Instant Crush"	—	150	—	—	—	—	—	—	—	—		Male
2021	"Build It Better"	—	—	—	—	—	—	—	—	— (Note: "Build It Better" did not enter the Official UK Top 100 Chart, but peaked at number 67 on the Official Singles Sales Chart Top 100 and at number 66 on the Official Singles Download Chart Top 100)	—		Firebird
2021	"Maybe It's Great"	—	—	—	—	—	—	—	—	—	—		Firebird
2021	"On My Way"	—	—	—	—	—	—	—	—	—	—		Firebird
2022	"Nothing Missing"	—	—	—	—	—	—	—	—	—	—		Firebird
2022	"Invisible Things"	—	—	—	—	—	—	—	—	—	—		Firebird
2022	"Story of My Life"	—	—	—	—	—	—	—	—	— (Note: "Story of My Life" did not enter the Official UK Top 100 Chart, but peaked at number 47 on the Official Singles Downloads Chart Top 100.)	—		Non-album single
2024	"Ultime Parole" (with Jack Savoretti)	—	—	—	—	—	—	—	—	—	—		Miss Italia
2026	"Upside Down"	—	—	—	—	—	—	—	—	—	—		Algorithm
2026	"Algorithm"	—	—	—	—	—	—	—	—	—	—		Algorithm
2026	"Just Drive"	—	—	—	—	—	—	—	—	—	—		Algorithm
2026	"Beautiful Love"	—	—	—	—	—	—	—	—	—	—		Algorithm
"—" denotes releases that did not chart or were not released in that country.

=== Promotional singles ===
List of promotional singles, showing year released and album name
Year	Title	Album
2009	"Wild About It"	Come to Life
2010	"Scars"	Come to Life

== Music videos ==
List of music videos, showing year released and directors
Year	Title	Director(s)
1997	"Torn"	Alison MacLean
1998	"Big Mistake"	Alison MacLean
1998	"Wishing I Was There" (UK version)	Alison MacLean
1998	"Wishing I Was There" (US version)	Matthew Rolston
1998	"Smoke"	Matthew Rolston
1999	"Identify"	Samuel Bayer
2001	"That Day" (Version one)	Big TV!
2001	"That Day" (Version two)	John Hillcoat
2002	"Wrong Impression"	Francis Lawrence
2002	"Beauty on the Fire"	Mike Lipscombe
2005	"Shiver"	Jake Nava
2005	"Counting Down the Days"	Giuseppe Capotondi
2007	"Glorious"	Frank Borin
2009	"Wild About It"	Mike Baldwin
2009	"Want"	Diane Martel
2010	"Scars"	Max & Dania
2015	"Instant Crush"	Joe Stephenson
2021	"Build It Better"	Amy Becker-Burnett
2021	"On My Way"	David Lopez Edwards and Natalie Imbruglia
2021	"Invisible Things"	Fraser Taylor
2022	"Nothing Missing"	
2026	"Just Drive"	
2026	"Beautiful Love"	

== Other appearances ==
These songs have not appeared on a studio album released by Imbruglia.

List of other appearances, showing year released and album name
Year	Title	Album
1999	"Troubled By the Way We Came Together"	Go Soundtrack
1999	"Never Tear Us Apart" (with Tom Jones)	Reload
1999	"Identify"	Stigmata Soundtrack
1999	"It's Only Rock 'n Roll (But I Like It)" (with various artists)	non-album release
2001	"Cold Air"	Y tu mamá también Soundtrack
2005	"Pineapple Head"	She Will Have Her Way
2007	"All the Magic"	Winx Club: The Secret of the Lost Kingdom
2010	"2000 Miles" (The Pretenders cover)	Free song
