= Glorious: The Singles 97–07 =

Greatest hits album by Natalie Imbruglia
- Released: 7 September 2007
- Recorded: 1997–2007
- Label: Brightside Recordings

Natalie Imbruglia chronology
Live from London (2007)	Glorious: The Singles 97–07 (2007)	Come to Life (2009)

Singles from Glorious: The Singles 97–07
- 1. "Glorious" Released: 27 August 2007

Professional ratings
Review scores
Source	Rating
AllMusic	3.5/5 stars
BBC Music	(positive)
Digital Spy	3/5 stars

Glorious: The Singles 97–07 is a greatest hits album by Australian singer-songwriter Natalie Imbruglia, celebrating ten years since the release of her first album, Left of the Middle. It was released on 10 September 2007 in the United Kingdom and on 22 September 2007 in Australia. The album consists of all nine singles released from Imbruglia's past three studio albums as well as five new songs including the single "Glorious". A limited-edition version includes a bonus DVD of Imbruglia's music videos. The album peaked at number 5 on the UK Albums Chart. It was certified Gold in the UK on 12 October 2007. The lead single "Glorious" was digitally released in the United States on 26 June 2012, but the album itself has yet to receive a release in the country.

== Track listing ==
No.	Title	Writer(s)	Producer(s)	Length
1.	"Glorious"	Natalie Imbruglia; Crispin Hunt	Hunt; Gareth Johnson^{[a]}	3:25
2.	"Counting Down the Days" (from Counting Down the Days, 2005)	Imbruglia; Matt Prime	Daniel Johns	4:09
3.	"Torn" (from Left of the Middle, 1997)	Phil Thornalley; Scott Cutler; Anne Preven	Thornalley	4:06
4.	"Wrong Impression" (from White Lilies Island, 2001)	Imbruglia; Gary Clark	Ian Stanley	4:15
5.	"Smoke" (from Left of the Middle, 1997)	Imbruglia; Matt Bronleewe	Bronleewe	4:32
6.	"Shiver" (from Counting Down the Days, 2005)	Imbruglia; Eg White; Sheppard Solomon	Stephen Lipson; Ash Howes^{[a]}; Martin Harrington^{[a]}	3:43
7.	"Wishing I Was There" (from Left of the Middle, 1997)	Imbruglia; Thornalley; Colin Campsie	Thornalley	3:52
8.	"That Day" (from White Lilies Island, 2001)	Imbruglia; Patrick Leonard	Stanley	4:43
9.	"Big Mistake" (from Left of the Middle, 1997)	Imbruglia; Mark Goldenberg	Goldenberg	4:34
10.	"Beauty on the Fire" (from White Lilies Island, 2001)	Imbruglia; Clark; Mat Wilder	Clark; Pascal Gabriel	4:15
11.	"Be with You"	Imbruglia; Johns; Clark	Ben Hillier	3:42
12.	"Amelia"	Imbruglia; Hillier; Dave McCracken	Hillier	4:23
13.	"Against the Wall"	Imbruglia; Johns; Clark	Hillier	3:45
14.	"Stuck on the Moon"	Imbruglia; Johns; Clark	Hillier	3:36

iTunes bonus track
No.	Title	Writer(s)	Producer(s)	Length
15.	"Identify" (from the Stigmata soundtrack, 1999)	Billy Corgan; Mike Garson	Henry Binns; Sam Hardaker	4:45

Japan edition
No.	Title	Writer(s)	Producer(s)	Length
15.	"That Girl"	Imbruglia; Martin Terefe; John Kennedy	Hillier	3:29
16.	"Glorious" (Music video)			3:25
17.	"Torn" (Music video)			4:15

Deluxe edition bonus DVD
No.	Title	Director(s)	Length
1.	"Torn"	Alison Maclean
2.	"Big Mistake"	Maclean
3.	"Wishing I Was There"	Maclean
4.	"Wishing I Was There" (US version)	Matthew Rolston
5.	"Smoke"	Rolston
6.	"That Day"	John Hillcoat
7.	"Wrong Impression"	Francis Lawrence
8.	"Beauty on the Fire"	Mike Lipscombe
9.	"Shiver"	Jake Nava
10.	"Counting Down the Days"	Giuseppe Capotondi
11.	"Glorious"	Frank Borin

- ^{^[a]} signifies a co-producer

== Charts ==
Chart (2007)	Peak position
Australian Albums (ARIA)	40
Belgian Albums (Ultratop Flanders)	75
Belgian Albums (Ultratop Wallonia)	37
European Top 100 Albums	16
Irish Albums (IRMA)	14
Italian Albums (FIMI)	19
Scottish Albums (OCC)	10
Spanish Albums (Promusicae)	88
Swiss Albums (Schweizer Hitparade)	28
UK Albums (OCC)	5

== Certifications and sales ==
Region	Certification	Certified units/sales
Russia (NFPF)	Gold	10,000^{*}
United Kingdom (BPI)	Gold	100,000^{^}
^{*} Sales figures based on certification alone.^{^} Shipments figures based on certification alone.

== Release history ==
Country	Release date	Label	Catalogue
Ireland	7 September 2007		
United Kingdom	10 September 2007		
Thailand	13 September 2007		
Australia	22 September 2007		
Mexico	24 September 2007		
Hong Kong	2007	Sony BMG Hong Kong	660678
