= Live from London (Natalie Imbruglia EP) =

EP by Natalie Imbruglia
- Released: 17 August 2007
- Genre: Pop; acoustic
- Label: Brightside Recordings

Natalie Imbruglia chronology
Counting Down the Days (2005)	Live from London (2007)	Glorious: The Singles 97–07 (2007)

Live from London is a digital EP by Australian pop singer Natalie Imbruglia, available exclusively through the iTunes Store as part of the Live from London series. It was released on 17 August 2007, through Brightside Recordings.

The EP contains five live acoustic versions of hits from her singles collection Glorious: The Singles 1997-2007.

== Track listing ==
No.	Title	Writer(s)	Length
1.	"Glorious" (live)	Natalie Imbruglia; Crispin Hunt	3:40
2.	"Wishing I Was There" (live)	Imbruglia; Colin Campsie; Phil Thornalley	4:17
3.	"Shiver" (live)	Imbruglia; Shep Solomon; Eg White	3:43
4.	"Smoke" (live)	Imbruglia; Matt Bronleewe	4:24
5.	"Torn" (live)	Scott Cutler; Anne Preven; Thornalley	4:28
Total length:			20:09
