= List of awards and nominations received by Julian Casablancas =

Julian Casablancas awards and nominations
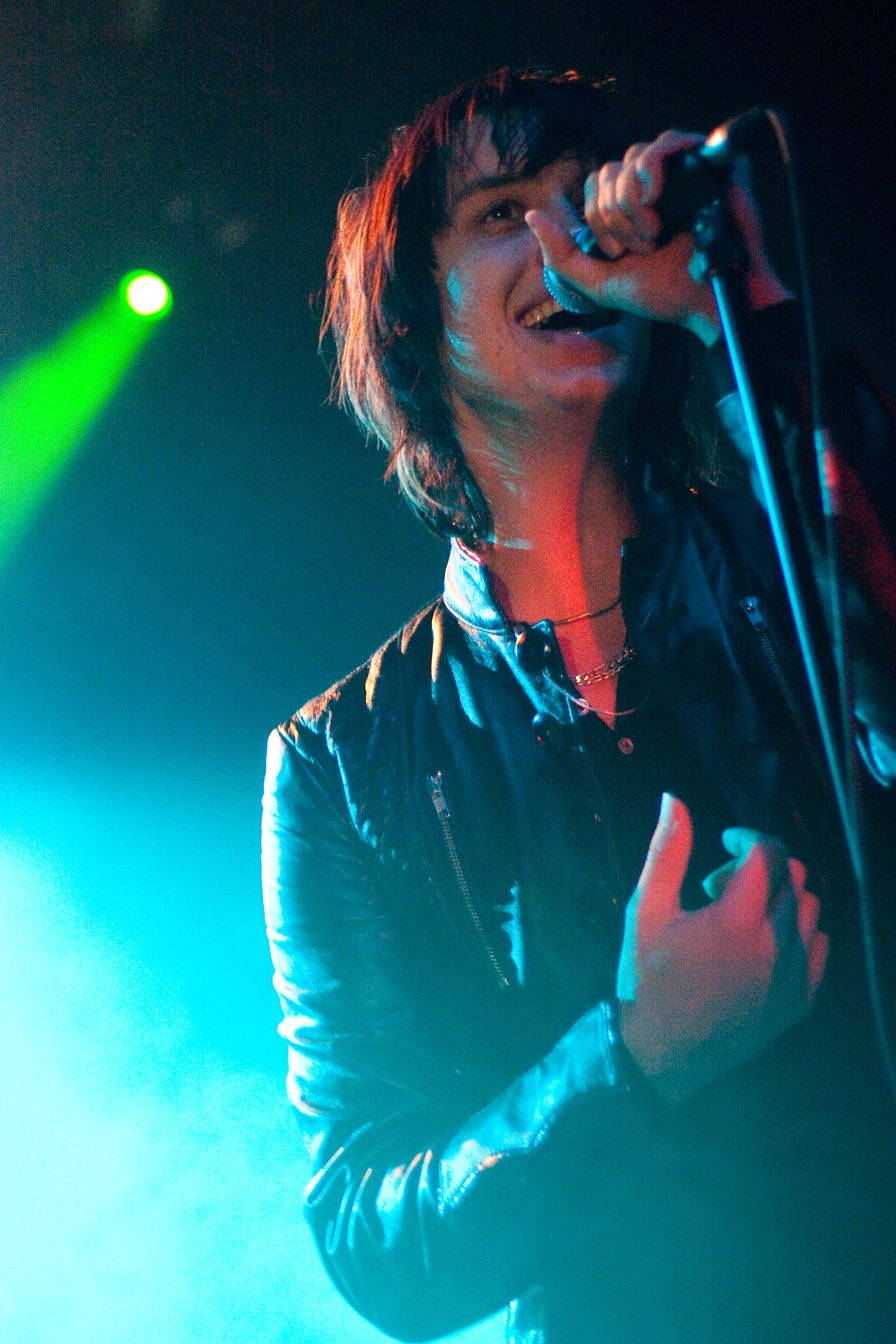
- Julian Casablancas in 2009
Awards and nominations
| Award | Wins | Nominations |
| Grammy | 2 | 2 |
| NME | 0 | 4 |
| World Music | 0 | 2 |

Totals (Note: Certain award groups do not simply award one winner. They acknowledge several different recipients, have runners-up, and have third place. Since this is a specific recognition and is different from losing an award, runner-up mentions are considered wins in this award tally. For simplification and to avoid errors, each award in this list has been presumed to have had a prior nomination.)
- Wins: 2
- Nominations: 8

American singer and songwriter Julian Casablancas has won 2 awards from 8 nominations as a soloist.

== Grammy Awards ==
The Grammy Awards are awarded annually by The Recording Academy of the United States for outstanding achievements in the music industry.

| Year | Nominee / work | Award | Result | Ref. |
|---|---|---|---|---|
| 2014 | Random Access Memories (as featured artist) | Album of the Year | Won | |
| 2021 | The New Abnormal | Best Rock Album | Won | |

== NME Awards ==
The NME Awards were created by the NME magazine and was first held in 1953.

| Year | Nominee / work | Award | Result | Ref. |
|---|---|---|---|---|
| 2003 | Julian Casablancas | Best Dressed | Nominated | |
| 2003 | Julian Casablancas | Hottest Man | Nominated | |
| 2010 | Julian Casablancas | Best Solo Artist | Nominated | |
| 2015 | "I don't know how many white people having brunch I can deal with on a Saturday afternoon." | Best Quote | Nominated | |

== World Music Awards ==
The World Music Awards is an annual international awards show founded in 1989 that honours recording artists based on worldwide sales figures provided by the International Federation of the Phonographic Industry (IFPI).

| Year | Nominee / work | Award | Result | Ref. |
|---|---|---|---|---|
| 2014 | "Instant Crush" | World's Best Song | Nominated | |
| 2014 | "Instant Crush" | World's Best Music Video | Nominated | |
