= Identify (song) =

1999 single by Natalie Imbruglia

Single by Natalie Imbruglia

from the album Stigmata O.S.T and Left of the Middle (Taiwanese edition)
- Released: 23 August 1999
- Length: 4:48 (LP version); 4:08 (radio edit)
- Label: Virgin
- Songwriters: Billy Corgan; Mike Garson
- Producers: Henry Binns; Sam Hardaker

Natalie Imbruglia singles chronology
"Smoke" (1998)	"Identify" (1999)	"That Day" (2001)

Audio
- "Identify" on YouTube

"Identify" is a song written by Billy Corgan and Mike Garson and performed by Australian singer Natalie Imbruglia for the soundtrack to the film Stigmata. In North America, the track was serviced to radio as the featured single from the soundtrack on 23 and 24 August 1999. "Identify" also appears on the Taiwanese edition of Imbruglia's debut studio album Left of the Middle, and later, was placed as a bonus track on the Japanese version of her greatest hits compilation, Glorious: The Singles 97–07, and later on the international digital version.

Billy Corgan originally wrote the song from a female protagonist perspective, with Garbage lead singer Shirley Manson in mind for the song, but her management turned the song down without her ever hearing it. "The idea of doing the title song came from trying to do something a little different. Back in the day, people tried to write a song that was directly connected to a movie's score," Corgan told Billboard, "So the music for "Identify" came from one of the love scenes in the movie".

== Critical reception ==
Billboard reviewer Chuck Taylor described "Identify" as a "moody, dreamlike gem", adding "there's a hint of Portishead here, an inkling of a James Bond theme, and a morsel showing Imbruglia's own growth. This is good stuff and far too credible for radio to dismiss... this could be the sleeper hit of the season." In terms of the Stigmata soundtrack, Stephen Erlewine of AllMusic gave the song the following review: "It's unfortunate that the entire album wasn't entirely instrumental, since it would have been a more satisfying listen. That's not to say that the first half of the album is terrible – there's quite a few good songs there, actually, highlighted by Björk's "All is Full of Love", Afro Celt Sound System & Sinéad O'Connor's "Release," and the Corgan-Garson written and Natalie Imbruglia performance "Identify."

== Music video ==
The music video for "Identify" was directed by Samuel Bayer, known for his clips for Nirvana, Smashing Pumpkins and Garbage and sees Imbruglia performing the song in a dark, broody style cavern, surrounded by ghosts and tombs. The "Identify" music video is featured as a bonus extra on the Stigmata DVD release.
