= Firebird (album) =

Studio album by Natalie Imbruglia
- Released: 24 September 2021
- Recorded: 2018–2021
- Genre: Pop
- Length: 52:07
- Label: BMG
- Producers: MyRiot; Natalie Imbruglia; Albert Hammond Jr.; Gus Oberg; Dave Izumi Lynch; Romeo Stodart

Natalie Imbruglia chronology
Male (2015)	Firebird (2021)	Algorithm (2026)

Singles from Firebird
- 1. "Build It Better" Released: 18 June 2021; 2. "Maybe It's Great" Released: 16 July 2021; 3. "On My Way" Released: 18 August 2021; 4. "Nothing Missing" Released: 13 January 2022; 5. "Invisible Things" Released: July 2022

Firebird is the sixth studio album by Australian-British singer-songwriter Natalie Imbruglia, released on 24 September 2021. It is her first album to feature original material since 2009's Come to Life and Imbruglia's first release with the record label BMG Rights Management.

The album was produced in various locations during lockdowns imposed as a result of the COVID-19 pandemic, and features songs co-written by Albert Hammond Jr., Romeo Stodart, KT Tunstall, Eg White, Fiona Bevan, and Rachel Furner, among others.

Upon announcement Imbruglia said "Making this album has been such a profound and satisfying experience. Having gone through a long period of what essentially was writer's block, it was sometimes hard to envisage getting to this place."

The album's lead single "Build It Better" was released with an accompanying music video on 18 June 2021.

== Singles ==
The first single, "Build It Better", was released on 18 June 2021. The official video for "Build It Better" was directed by Amy Becker-Burnett, with choreography by Gregory Haney and Alex Sarmiento. "Build It Better" did not enter the Official UK Top 100 Chart, but peaked at number 67 on the Official Singles Sales Chart Top 100 and at number 66 on the Official Singles Download Chart Top 100.

"Maybe It's Great" was released on 16 July 2021. In an album review Retro Pop called the song a "synth-laden '80s pop gem".

"On My Way" was released as the third single on 18 August 2021.

"Nothing Missing" was released as the fourth single on 28 January 2022. Its video was released on 20 February 2022. The song was co-written by KT Tunstall.

== Chart performance ==
In Australia, Firebird debuted at number 30 on the ARIA Albums Chart.

In the United Kingdom, the album debuted and peaked at number 10 on the UK Albums Chart. The week after Imbruglia won the third series of The Masked Singer in February 2022, Firebird re-entered the UK Official Album Downloads Chart Top 100 at number 32 on 18 February 2022. Firebird went on to chart on the UK Album Downloads Chart Top 100 for six weeks.

== Critical reception ==
Professional ratings
Review scores
Source	Rating
AllMusic	3.5/5 stars
Evening Standard	4/5 stars
The Guardian	3/5 stars
Retro Pop	3/5 stars
Riff Magazine	5/10
The Sydney Morning Herald	3/5 stars

Evening Standard called the album "A perfect mix of nostalgia and rebirth, even in 2021 Imbruglia deserves her place in the spotlight."

Shaad D'Souza from The Guardian said the album "is delightfully unburdened: a carefree survey of pop and rock trends that re-establishes the fact that, at her best, Imbruglia is a canny lyricist and an incisive, whip-smart writer of hooks."

Retro Pop called the first half of the album "endearing" but said "it wears thin over the course of 14 songs, with the latter portion of the record meandering without ever gaining pace." They concluded saying "There's no doubt about it, Natalie Imbruglia is a brilliant pop star, and it's unfortunate she settled on such an exhaustive release – because buried within Firebird is a stellar 10-track album."

Rachel Alm from Riff Magazine said "Many of the songs on Firebird sound very close to contemporary country and could have even benefited from leaning into that a bit more." Alm added "The second half of the album is mostly piano ballads... [and] for an album that started out so upbeat, it seems to run out of steam by the end. All in all, though, it's a nice taste of '90s nostalgia by Natalie Imbruglia."

== Track listing ==
Firebird track listing
No.	Title	Writer(s)	Producer(s)	Length
1.	"Build It Better"	Natalie Imbruglia; Fiona Bevan; Luke Fitton	MyRiot; Imbruglia^{[a]}	3:23
2.	"Nothing Missing"	Imbruglia; KT Tunstall; Roy Kerr; Tim Bran	MyRiot; Imbruglia	3:14
3.	"What It Feels Like"	Imbruglia; Chiara Hunter; Fitton	MyRiot; Imbruglia	3:53
4.	"On My Way"	Imbruglia; Francis White	MyRiot; Imbruglia	3:36
5.	"Maybe It's Great"	Imbruglia; Albert Hammond Jr.; Erik Gus Oberg	Hammond Jr; Gus Oberg; MyRiot^{[a]}; Imbruglia^{[a]}	3:54
6.	"Just Like Old Times"	Imbruglia; Fitton; Rachel Furner	MyRiot; Imbruglia	3:39
7.	"When You Love Too Much"	Imbruglia; Caroline Watkins	MyRiot; Imbruglia	3:07
8.	"Not Sorry"	Imbruglia; White	MyRiot; Imbruglia	3:11
9.	"Human Touch"	Imbruglia; Romeo Stodart	MyRiot; Imbruglia	4:16
10.	"Change of Heart"	Imbruglia; Jim Duguid; Stodart	MyRiot; Imbruglia	3:47
11.	"Invisible Things"	Imbruglia; Andrew DeRoberts; Josie Dunne	MyRiot; Imbruglia	3:14
12.	"Dive to the Deep"	Imbruglia; Amit Ofir; Caroline Brooks	MyRiot; Imbruglia	3:54
13.	"River"	Imbruglia; Bevan	MyRiot; Imbruglia	4:04
14.	"Firebird"	Imbruglia; Stodart	Dave Izumi Lynch; Imbruglia; Stodart	4:55
Total length:				52:07

Notes

- ^{^[a]} signifies an additional producer.

== Charts ==
Chart performance for Firebird
Chart (2021)	Peak position
Australian Albums (ARIA)	30
Belgian Albums (Ultratop Wallonia)	54
Scottish Albums (Official Charts)	3
Swiss Albums (Schweizer Hitparade)	69
UK Albums (Official Charts)	10
UK Independent Albums (Official Charts)	2

== Release history ==
Release history and formats for Firebird
Region	Date	Format	Label	Ref.
Various	24 September 2021	CD; digital download; streaming; vinyl	BMG	

== See also ==
- List of UK top-ten albums in 2021
