= Maybe It's Great =

2021 single by Natalie Imbruglia

Single by Natalie Imbruglia

from the album Firebird
- Released: 16 July 2021
- Studio: Rockinghorse Studios, Byron Bay
- Genre: Electronic pop
- Length: 3:55
- Label: BMG
- Songwriters: Natalie Imbruglia; Albert Hammond Jr.; Erik Gus Oberg
- Producers: MyRiot; Imbruglia; Hammond Jr.; Oberg

Natalie Imbruglia singles chronology
"Build It Better" (2021)	"Maybe It's Great" (2021)	"On My Way" (2021)

"Maybe It's Great" is a song by Australian singer-songwriter Natalie Imbruglia, released on 16 July 2021 as the promotional single from her sixth studio album, Firebird.

Discussing the track upon release, Imbruglia said: "It was a dream come true to work with Albert Hammond Jr. We had such a great time recording in Byron Bay and this track gives me all the VHS 80s vibes. His energetic guitar was the cherry on top! He didn't disappoint."

== Reception ==
Jon Stickler from Stereo Board described the song as an "'80s-inspired synth-pop anchored by a driving beat". Culture Fix called it "a rousing pop anthem that truly asserts the singer's welcome return to the world of pop music."

== Digital Single ==
International

1. "Maybe It's Great" - 3:54
