= Want (Natalie Imbruglia song) =

2009 single by Natalie Imbruglia

Single by Natalie Imbruglia

from the album Come to Life
- Released: September 2009
- Studio: The Bakery (London, England)
- Genre: Dance-pop; synth-pop
- Length: 4:20
- Songwriters: Natalie Imbruglia; Daniel Johns; Gary Clark; Chris Martin
- Producer: Ben Hillier

Natalie Imbruglia singles chronology
"Glorious" (2007)	"Want" (2009)	"Instant Crush" (2015)

Music video
- "Want" on YouTube

"Want" is the first single taken from the Australian singer-songwriter Natalie Imbruglia's fourth studio album, Come to Life (2009). The single was released in September 2009, two weeks before the release of the album in Europe and Australia. The track was written by Natalie Imbruglia, Daniel Johns under the pseudonym of Kat Kourtney, Gary Clark and Chris Martin and is one of three songs on the album co-written by Martin.

== Overview ==
The song is written from Imbruglia's point of view and is aimed at a past lover. She bitterly sings that she has moved on and hopes that her ex can do the same. The line "I hope you get all that you want, cause I didn't" is repeated numerous times during the chorus. The song incorporates the lyrics from Natalie's 2007 song "Be with You" from her album Glorious: The Singles 1997-2007. The first verse of "Be with You" is sung during the middle 8 of "Want" with the last line changed from "And if you listen hard enough you'll hear" to "And if you listen carefully you'll hear the sound".

Imbruglia thought the chorus was too "lightweight". Chris Martin told her to dump the song altogether, but she told him to fix it instead. Imbruglia said of the song:

I put some pressure on him -- maybe he felt guilty because he'd been so honest. It was originally a sweet love song, and with that synth part he put on it, it became a bit more sinister.

== Release and promotion ==
The song was premiered on 10 August 2009, on Russia's "Love Radio". Imbruglia held a small promotional tour in Australia to support the album and single, making several television appearances and radio interviews. "Want" has been performed at all of Imbruglia's concerts since its release. Notable live performances in 2009 included Le Concert Pour La Tolerance on 11 July, V Festival on 23 August, Quelli che il calcio e... on 20 September, "GMTV" on 28 September, This Morning on 7 October, and Italy's X Factor on 4 November also appearing as a guest judge.

== Music video ==
Imbruglia lying topless on a bed in the music video.

The music video for the song was filmed on 25 August 2009 by Diane Martel. It was premiered on 10 September 2009. The video shows Imbruglia lying topless on a bed, as well as recording herself with a camera. It also shows her walking around a room, again recording herself. Halfway through the video, Imbruglia is seen with mascara running down her face, showing she has been crying, all the while recording herself. Towards the end of the video scenes of Imbruglia crying in a chair are shown between scenes of her on the bed and walking around. The video finishes with Imbruglia on the bed covering her breasts with one hand whilst moving the camera's view away from her face.

== Reception ==
PopJustice called "Want" "an elegant, spooksome dreampop [...] that continues to blossom with every listen [and is] properly amazing". Digital Spy gave the song another positive review, giving it 4 out of 5 stars and commented: "With its galloping horse rhythms, cascading melodies and tightly-layered production, the track itself brings to mind Kate Bush hitting the dancefloor – a somewhat unlikely image in 2009 [...] a single with a markedly more urgent sound and a video that walks a tightrope between racy and classy".

== Track listing ==
Digital download

1. "Want" – 4:20
2. "Want" (Fraser T Smith Remix) – 3:04

Promotional Remix CD single

1. "Want" (New Album Edit) – 3:35
2. "Want" (Blunt Laser Remix) – 5:24
3. "Want" (Buzz Junkies Club Remix) – 6:03
4. "Want" (Buzz Junkies Radio Edit) – 3:22
5. "Want" (Cassette Club Remix) – 7:42
6. "Want" (The Shapeshifters Nocturnal Mix) – 6:52
7. "Want" (The Shapeshifters Vocal Mix) – 8:39

== Charts ==
"Want" debuted at #31 on the Australian Top 100 Airplay Chart for the week ending 12 September 2009, gaining plenty of airplay on the Australian FOX, 2DAY and NOVA networks. It was the highest new entry on the chart in its first week and peaked at #22 after 16 weeks on the chart. The song debuted on the Italian Singles Chart at #18 and, in the following week, peaked at #6. "Want" failed to enter the Australian Singles Chart, despite peaking at #22 on the Airplay Chart. The single reached #88 on the UK Singles Chart.

=== Weekly charts ===
Chart (2009)	Peak position
Australia (ARIA)	142
Australian Airplay Chart	22
Belgium (Ultratip Bubbling Under Flanders)	2
Belgium (Ultratop 50 Wallonia)	27
CIS Airplay (TopHit)	95
Czech Republic Airplay (ČNS IFPI)	38
Italy (FIMI)	6
Slovakia Airplay (ČNS IFPI)	76
UK Singles (Official Charts)	88

=== Year-end charts ===
Chart (2009)	Position
Italian Singles Chart	56

=== Certifications ===
Region	Certification	Certified units/sales
Italy (FIMI)	Gold	15,000^{*}
^{‡} Sales+streaming figures based on certification alone.
