= Build It Better =

2021 single by Natalie Imbruglia

Single by Natalie Imbruglia

from the album Firebird
- Released: 18 June 2021
- Length: 3:23
- Label: BMG
- Songwriters: Natalie Imbruglia; Fiona Bevan; Luke Fitton
- Producers: MyRiot; Imbruglia

Natalie Imbruglia singles chronology
"Instant Crush" (2015)	"Build It Better" (2021)	"Maybe It's Great" (2021)

"Build It Better" is a song by Australian singer-songwriter Natalie Imbruglia, released on 18 June 2021 as the lead single from her sixth studio album Firebird.

Natalie said the song is about "surrendering to the chaos and seeing what's on the other side of it is a good life lesson. Letting something fall apart, and being okay with that, is something that I have had to do in my life, numerous times, but especially moving into this record and becoming a mum. So, I'm really excited about that song, and about the video, which is total escapist fun – the world needs that right now."

== Music video ==
The music video was released on 18 June 2021. The video brings a touch of La La Land to a petrol station in Aylesford, with Natalie singing about having a positive outlook when things fall apart.

== Reception ==
Jackson Langford from Music Feeds called it "one stomper of a bop, with glory-filled acoustic guitar and electrifying piano that helps radiate the same type of optimism Imbruglia sings about." scenestr described the song as "instantly-catchy". Quentin Harrison from Albumism said "'Build It Better' is a gorgeous kickoff to this new project and confirms that changing industry standards and trends aside, Imbruglia is always en vogue."

== Charts ==
Chart (2021)	Peak position
UK Singles Downloads (Official Charts)	66
