= Algorithm (Natalie Imbruglia album) =

2026 studio album by Natalie Imbruglia

Studio album by Natalie Imbruglia
- Released: 4 September 2026
- Recorded: January 2024 – November 2025
- Studios: Scampton Mews, One Eyed Jack's, Stumbles, Utopia, and Branland (London)
- Length: 36:23
- Label: Landgirl
- Producers: Mark Crew; Natalie Imbruglia; MyRiot; Anu Pillai; Dan Priddy; Tobie Tripp

Natalie Imbruglia chronology
Firebird (2021)	Algorithm (2026)

Singles from Algorithm
- 1. "Upside Down" Released: 29 April 2026; 2. "Algorithm" Released: 17 June 2026; 3. "Just Drive" Released: 24 July 2026; 4. "Beautiful Love" Released: 4 September 2026

Algorithm is the seventh studio album by Australian–British singer-songwriter Natalie Imbruglia. The record was released on 4 September 2026 by Imbruglia's own label Landgirl Records. Imbruglia independently financed the album's recording, and co-wrote every song. She co-wrote and co-produced material with musicians including MyRiot – whom she collaborated with on her 2021 album Firebird – as well as Gary Lightbody of Snow Patrol, Fraser T. Smith, Tobie Tripp, Mark Crew, David Sneddon, Anu Pillai and Dan Priddy.

Imbruglia chose to work with songwriters who could also co-produce the material, saying it was important for her to work with collaborators who could be involved in every aspect of a song's creation. The album contains personal themes relating to Imbruglia's neurodivergent, attention deficit hyperactivity disorder and obsessive-compulsive disorder diagnoses. Musically, the record contains songs influenced by the pop, rock, electropop, dance and disco genres, with Imbruglia describing it as an upbeat album.

"Upside Down" was released as the album's lead single on 29 April, followed by "Algorithm" on 17 June, "Just Drive" on 24 July and "Beautiful Love" on 4 September.

== Composition and style ==
Imbruglia co-wrote and co-produced every song on Algorithm. She specifically co-wrote the material with musicians who also had the ability to co-produce, saying it was important for everyone involved to be invested enough to oversee a song's creation "from start to finish". Musically, Algorithm contains songs influenced by the pop, rock, dance and disco genres. It features contributions from MyRiot – whom Imbruglia worked with on her 2021 album Firebird – Gary Lightbody of Snow Patrol, Mark Crew, David Sneddon and Anu Pillai, as well as Fraser T. Smith, Tobie Tripp, and Dan Priddy.

She said the album's creation coincided with "the most challenging time I've had with my mental health. This is the beauty of music and artistic expression. You can take something dark and turn it into light." Imbruglia has been diagnosed as neurodivergent, and as having attention deficit hyperactivity disorder and obsessive-compulsive disorder. She said songwriting was helpful in dealing with her diagnosis, describing songwriting as an effective method to "vomit it all out". However, she described Algorithm as an upbeat record, saying she "tried to bring a sense of humour to it".

She described the recording sessions as "by far the most fun I've ever had making a record", and that she hopes people will "get as much joy from listening to this record as we did making it. And that they dance their arses off." In order to retain creative control, Imbruglia financed the recording of Algorithm herself.

=== Songs ===
Several songs on the album were inspired by Eurythmics. Imbruglia said that musically, album opener "Debbie" is "me imagining I'm Annie Lennox with Dave Stewart playing next to me." She said the track is "a song to myself—to not be a Debbie Downer, because your time is coming."

Imbruglia said the lyric of "Upside Down" is about her "inability to control" her emotions. She said that "wrestling with fight or flight mode was awful, and I was reaching this critical point with it. In a way, the song is about how sheer willpower – trying to force your way out of something – doesn't always work. You need tools, support. So that's where the song was born from, that fight to maintain a semblance of what some might consider normality." Women in Pop called it "a sparkling, jangly pop track shot through with synths and guitars, in many places giving a throwback feel to late 1990s-early 2000s pop." Similarly, Stereoboard described it as "a bright, upbeat pop offering", while Owen George of Gold Coast said the song "opens with bright synths and energetic percussion, elevating her distinctive voice. As the chorus hits, it becomes a shimmering release of energy. Yet beneath the upbeat tempo lies a deeply personal narrative." Music News said: "The album's lead single Upside Down, out now, is the clearest window into that struggle — a bright, shimmering pop track built on the moment she realised she couldn’t simply 'power through' anymore.

"Algorithm" is an electronic pop song, and was co-written and co-produced by Imbruglia with English electronic duo MyRiot, best known for their work with Primal Scream and London Grammar. Imbruglia explained the lyric was inspired by social media, specifically the use of "scrolling" recommender systems. She said: "It's like you've opened one trapdoor and you're falling endlessly through one after another. I'm a deeply spiritual person, so [the song] comes from a place of real concern for the world we're living in. We're in a dark place and psychological warfare is being waged upon us. We need to talk about that and where our thoughts are going. This is about sparking that conversation." Stereoboard said the song contains "dark, pulsing synths". Music-News.com said the song was Imbruglia's "most musically ambitious offering to date", saying it was "Driven by dark, crunching synths that evoke the sonic landscape of Depeche Mode", and "features Imbruglia shifting effortlessly between an alluring siren's call and an enigmatic, David Bowie-esque drawl."

Imbruglia said the lyric of "Jesus on Mars" has "a few funny in-jokes about my OCD. Like I can't have the sheets in the house mixed up. If my equipment didn't turn up to a festival, I'm fine with a big problem, but if my pillowcases get mixed up, I will have a nervous breakdown." "Who Dimmed the Lights" is about Imbruglia's experience with perimenopause, and how it exacerbated her symptoms of neurodivergence. However, she said it was an "uplifting" track, noting that her previous work tended to be melancholic. She said: "I think it's so nice to figure out a way of getting important messages across, but also have the music be uplifting", elaborating: "I don't want there to be any shame around [perimenopause], and there shouldn't be. And knowledge is power. And also, just being brave because it's not our fault that these changes are happening and it happens to every single woman."

"Just Drive" was written "about a breakup, and about something I think a lot of us do, which is hiding how we feel to make other people feel better. Sometimes you'd rather go through it on your own, as hard as that is. You love the other person so much, you don't want to put them through it too." Total Ntertainment said the song "finds Natalie wrapping her tender-yet-ravishing vocal flair in a whirlpool of electro-pop elegance: a cocktail of luminous, beacon-like synths, flourishes of piano melody, and a juddering, pulsating beat, which calls to mind the cathartic release of Robyn's 'Dancing on My Own'".

== Release and promotion ==
The album's title was announced by Imbruglia on 29 April 2026, the same day "Upside Down" was issued as its lead single. The album's title track was released as the second single on 17 June, followed by "Just Drive" on 24 July. Imbruglia supported the album with a series of large outdoor shows, including stadium appearances supporting Ricky Martin and Tom Jones, shows in New Zealand supporting Bryan Adams, as well as festival appearances and concerts in Europe and Mexico. The album was released on 4 September, by Imbruglia's own independent record label Landgirl Records, an imprint of Republic of Music. She derived the name of the label from her son's school lessons of World War II. Also on September 4, "Beautiful Love" was released as the album's fourth single.

== Track listing ==
Algorithm – Standard edition
No.	Title	Writer(s)	Producer(s)	Length
1.	"Debbie"	Natalie Imbruglia; Tim Bran; Roy Kerr	Imbruglia; MyRiot	3:44
2.	"Upside Down"	Imbruglia; David Sneddon; Anu Pillai	Imbruglia; Pillai	3:27
3.	"Catastrophe"	Imbruglia; Sneddon; Mark Crew; Dan Priddy	Imbruglia; Priddy; Crew	2:20
4.	"Algorithm (Interlude)"	Imbruglia; Bran; Kerr	Imbruglia; MyRiot	0:38
5.	"Algorithm"	Imbruglia; Bran; Kerr	Imbruglia; MyRiot	3:52
6.	"Sounds Like It Feels"	Imbruglia; Bran; Kerr	Imbruglia; MyRiot	3:20
7.	"Jesus on Mars"	Imbruglia; Sneddon; Tobie Tripp	Imbruglia; Tripp	2:09
8.	"Who Dimmed the Lights"	Imbruglia; Sneddon; Tripp	Imbruglia; Tripp	3:15
9.	"End Game"	Imbruglia; Sneddon; Pillai	Imbruglia; Pillai	3:08
10.	"Just Drive"	Imbruglia; Bran; Kerr	Imbruglia; MyRiot	3:48
11.	"Breathe with the Fire Lola"	Imbruglia; Bran; Kerr	Imbruglia; MyRiot	3:01
12.	"Beautiful Love"	Imbruglia; Fraser T. Smith; Gary Lightbody	Imbruglia; Smith; Lightbody; MyRiot	3:30
Total length:				36:12

Algorithm – CD deluxe edition
No.	Title	Writer(s)	Producer(s)	Length
13.	"It Ends with You"	Imbruglia; Bran; Kerr	Imbruglia; MyRiot	3:25
14.	"The Last Slow Dance"	Imbruglia; Bran; Kerr	Imbruglia; MyRiot	3:23
Total length:				43:06

Algorithm – Digital deluxe edition, and vinyl edition bonus 7" single
No.	Title	Writer(s)	Producer(s)	Length
13.	"Bird of Paradise"	Imbruglia; Sneddon; Pillai	Imbruglia; Pillai	3:52
14.	"Darling There's Another Me"	Imbruglia; Romeo Stodart; Sneddon; Pillai	Imbruglia; Pillai	3:18
Total length:				43:22

=== Notes ===
- "Algorithm (Interlude)" is an unlisted hidden track on all physical editions of the album.

== Credits and personnel ==
Credits adapted from the liner notes of the album's CD and vinyl editions.

- "Upside Down" and "End Game" recorded at Scampton Mews, London, January 2024; "Catastrophe" recorded at One Eyed Jack's Studio, London, March 2024; "Bird of Paradise" recorded at Scampton Mews, July 2024; "Darling There's Another Me" recorded at Scampton Mews, September 2024; "Jesus on Mars" and "Who Dimmed the Lights" recorded at Stumbles Studios, London, January 2025; "Beautiful Love" recorded at Utopia Studios and Branland Studios, London, September 2025; "Debbie", "Algorithm", "Sounds Like It Feels", "Just Drive", "Breathe with the Fire Lola", "It Ends with You" and "The Last Slow Dance" recorded at Branland Studios, November 2025.

=== Musicians ===
- Natalie Imbruglia – lead and backing vocals
- Tim Bran – backing vocals, bass, keyboards, programming and engineering on "Sounds Like It Feels", "It Ends with You" and "The Last Slow Dance"; backing vocals on "Algorithm"; bass on "Debbie"; keyboards, programming and engineering on "Debbie", "Algorithm", "Just Drive" and "Breathe with the Fire Lola"
- Mark Crew – keyboards, programming and engineering on "Catastrophe"
- Mike Fonte – guitars on "Darling There's Another Me"
- Roy Kerr – backing vocals, keyboards, programming and engineering on "Algorithm", "Sounds Like It Feels", "It Ends with You" and "The Last Slow Dance"; keyboards, programming and engineering on "Debbie" and "Breathe with the Fire Lola"
- Gary Lightbody – backing vocals, keyboards and programming on "Beautiful Love"
- Anuroop Pillai – backing vocals on "Upside Down"; acoustic and electric guitars, keyboards, programming and engineering on "Upside Down", "End Game", "Bird of Paradise"; keyboards, programming and engineering on "Darling There's Another Me"
- Dan Priddy – backing vocals, bass, keyboards, programming, drums and engineering on "Catastrophe"
- Jimmy Simms – bass on "Upside Down", "End Game", "Bird of Paradise" and "Darling There's Another Me"
- Ash Soan – drums and engineering on "Upside Down", "End Game", "Bird of Paradise" and "Darling There's Another Me"; drums on "Jesus on Mars"
- Fraser T. Smith – electric guitar, keyboards, piano and programming on "Beautiful Love"
- David Sneddon – backing vocals on "Upside Down", "Catastrophe", "Sounds Like It Feels", "Jesus on Mars", "Who Dimmed the Lights", "End Game", "Bird of Paradise" and "Darling There's Another Me"; keyboards and piano on "Upside Down", "End Game" and "Bird of Paradise"
- Tobie Tripp – backing vocals, guitars, bass, synthesizer and engineering on "Jesus on Mars" and "Who Dimmed the Lights"; percussion on "Jesus on Mars"; piano on "Who Dimmed the Lights"; strings on "Who Dimmed the Lights" and "Bird of Paradise"
- Nick Tsang – electric guitar on "Upside Down"

=== Technical ===
- Warren Beeby – artwork and design
- Dick Beetham – mastering
- Catherine Marks – mixing
- Louis Rogove – engineering on "Beautiful Love"
- Jackson Wiebe – engineering
- Rankin – photography

== Charts ==
Chart performance for Algorithm
Chart (2026)	Peak position
Australian Albums (ARIA)	81
Scottish Albums (Official Charts)	15
UK Albums (Official Charts)	22
UK Independent Albums (Official Charts)	3
