= Male (Natalie Imbruglia album) =

Studio album by Natalie Imbruglia
- Released: 31 July 2015
- Studio: Turtle Sound Studios (Weston, CT); Playback Recording Studios (Santa Barbara, CA)
- Length: 42:40
- Label: Portrait
- Producer: Billy Mann

Natalie Imbruglia chronology
Come to Life (2009)	Male (2015)	Firebird (2021)

Singles from Male
- 1. "Instant Crush" Released: 23 March 2015

Male is the fifth studio album by Australian-British singer Natalie Imbruglia, released by Portrait on 31 July 2015. It was released in Europe on 21 August 2015.

Male is Imbruglia's first album in six years and features the singer covering tracks made famous by male-led acts, hence the album's title.

== Critical reception ==
Professional ratings
Aggregate scores
Source	Rating
Metacritic	65/100
Review scores
Source	Rating
AllMusic	3.5/5 stars
Billboard	3/5 stars
The Guardian	3/5 stars
Rolling Stone	3/5 stars

Male received generally positive reviews from music critics. At Metacritic, which assigns a normalised rating out of 100 to reviews from mainstream critics, the album received an average score of 65, which indicates "generally favorable reviews", based on four reviews by critics.

== Tour ==
On 7 February 2017, Imbruglia announced that she would embark on the 2017 Acoustic Tour in support of the album, which took place from April to May 2017.

== Track listing ==
No.	Title	Writer(s)	Original artist	Length
1.	"Instant Crush"	Guy-Manuel de Homem-Christo; Thomas Bangalter; Julian Casablancas	Daft Punk featuring Julian Casablancas	4:52
2.	"Cannonball"	Damien Rice	Damien Rice	3:27
3.	"The Summer"	Josh Pyke	Josh Pyke	3:18
4.	"I Will Follow You into the Dark"	Ben Gibbard	Death Cab for Cutie	3:25
5.	"Goodbye in His Eyes"	Zac Brown; Wyatt Durette; John Driskell Hopkins; Sonia Leigh	Zac Brown Band	4:35
6.	"Friday I'm in Love"	Perry Bamonte; Boris Williams; Simon Gallup; Robert Smith; Porl Thompson	The Cure	3:16
7.	"Naked as We Came"	Samuel Beam	Iron & Wine	2:36
8.	"Let My Love Open the Door"	Pete Townshend	Pete Townshend	3:08
9.	"Only Love Can Break Your Heart"	Neil Young	Neil Young	2:50
10.	"I Melt with You"	Robbie Grey; Gary McDowell; Richard Brown; Michael Conroy; Stephen Walker	Modern English	4:07
11.	"The Waiting"	Tom Petty	Tom Petty and the Heartbreakers	3:16
12.	"The Wind"	Cat Stevens	Cat Stevens	2:13
13.	"Instant Crush" (radio edit) (bonus track)	Homem-Christo; Bangalter; Casablancas	Daft Punk featuring Julian Casablancas	3:26
Total length:				42:40

== Charts ==
Chart (2015)	Peak position
Australian Albums (ARIA)	25
Belgian Albums (Ultratop Wallonia)	139
German Albums (Offizielle Top 100)	97
Scottish Albums (OCC)	23
Swiss Albums (Schweizer Hitparade)	50
UK Albums (OCC)	20

== Release history ==
Region	Date	Format	Label	Ref.
Various	31 July 2015	CD; digital download	Sony Music	
New Zealand	31 July 2015	CD	Sony Music	
Europe	21 August 2015	CD; digital download	Sony Music	
Australia	11 September 2015	CD; digital download	Sony Music	
New Zealand	11 September 2015	Digital download	Sony Music	

== See also ==
- Strange Little Girls, a 2001 album by Tori Amos with a similar concept
