= Counting Down the Days =

Studio album by Natalie Imbruglia
- Released: 4 April 2005
- Studios: Olympic Studios, RAK Studios, Westside Studios, The Dairy, David's Studio (London, England); Compton Way Studios; Jacobs Studios (Farnham, England); AM Studios; Studios 301 (Sydney, Australia); The Egbox
- Genre: Pop rock
- Length: 42:40
- Labels: Brightside
- Producers: Gary Clark; Eg White; Martin Harrington; Ben Hillier; Ash Howes; Daniel Johns; David Kosten; Stephen Lipson; Paul Mac; Ian Stanley

Natalie Imbruglia chronology
White Lilies Island (2001)	Counting Down the Days (2005)	Live from London (2007)

Singles from Counting Down the Days
- 1. "Shiver" Released: 21 March 2005; 2. "Counting Down the Days" Released: 25 July 2005

Counting Down the Days is the third studio album by Australian singer Natalie Imbruglia. It was released by Brightside Recordings on 4 April 2005 in the United Kingdom. Her debut with the label, Imbruglia reteamed with Gary Clark to work on her next project, but also consulted a wider range of producers to collaborate with her, including Eg White, Martin Harrington, Ben Hillier, Ash Howes, David Kosten, Stephen Lipson, Paul Mac, and Ian Stanley. Musically, unlike White Lilies Island which was predominantly darker and moodier, Counting Down the Days saw Imbruglia's return to radio-friendly pop songs.

The album received generally favorable reviews, to which compliment was given for having a handful of genuinely great songs, even though critics were disappointed of its play-it-safe attitude that undid some of the good works and risks taken by its predecessor, White Lilies Island. The album's lead single, "Shiver" (2005), was a commercial hit, particularly in the UK, and officially became the UK's most broadcast song of 2005 according to PPL. To support the album, Imbruglia went on a small European concert tour from October to November 2005 with 21 shows across Europe, including eight shows in the UK alone.

== Critical reception ==
Professional ratings
Review scores
Source	Rating
AllMusic	3/5 stars
The Guardian	3/5 stars
laut.de	2/5 stars
MTV Asia	8/10
Yahoo! Music UK	7/10 stars

Betty Clarke, writing for The Guardian, felt that "Revisiting the mid-tempo rhythms of her last album, Imbruglia turns from muse to troubled girl next door, gushing about love and fretting about voices in her head, while acoustic guitars, flutes and strings whip a radio-friendly pop froth around her. Bored with pushing perfection, she's selling an old-fashioned brand of submission, her feisty edge eroded to a disturbing gratefulness. [...] Imbruglia's voice sounds better than ever – hanging on to words as if she's rolling out an expensive carpet." The Manchester Evening News concluded: "From the acoustic simplicity of "Starting Today" and the stirring title track, to the indie-esque guitar swirl of "Sanctuary", and the stark and bare piano-led "On The Run", Counting Down the Days demonstrates how the former Neighbours actress has evolved into an organic and formidable singing/songwriting talent."

Top of The Pops called the album a "rather nice selection of bright and breezy songs of the guitar pop persuasion" and wrote: "Don't expect any experimental brain-busting instrument-wracking though. Counting Down the Days has about as much edge as Westlife in bubblewrap Tuxedo's." AllMusic editor Jon O'Brien found that the album suggested "a confusing and disappointing change in direction. For all the bittersweet melancholy and dark undertones of White Lilies Island suggested an interesting career ahead, yet only on a few occasions does Counting Down the Days veer into this territory. Instead, the majority is made up of fairly inoffensive radio-friendly pop songs [...] Counting Down the Days will undoubtedly be a commercial success but its play-it-safe attitude undoes some of the good work done by its predecessor. A few more risks next time wouldn't go amiss."

== Commercial performance ==
The album was particularly successful in Europe, surpassing the chart performance of her previous album White Lilies Island (2001) in several countries. Upon release, Counting Down the Days debuted at number one on the UK Albums Chart, becoming Imbruglia's first album to top the UK chart. A steady seller, it was certified Gold by the British Phonographic Industry (BPI) on 21 April 2005, and has since sold more than 207,000 units. Counting Down the Days also reached number two in Scotland, number nine in Switzerland, number 10 in Italy, number 12 in Ireland, number 21 in Belgium, and number 22 in France.

In contrast, the album's performance in Australia, Imbruglia's home country, was modest by comparison, opening and peaking at number 12 on the Australian Albums Chart. Counting Down the Days did not receive an official North American release until 2010, largely due to her departure from RCA Records and her partnership with a newly founded label that promoted the album selectively, focusing primarily on the UK market. While it failed to chart with Billboard in the United States, it entered the Canadian Albums Chart however.

== Track listing ==
Credits adapted from the album's liner notes.

No.	Title	Writer(s)	Producer(s)	Length
1.	"Starting Today"	Natalie Imbruglia; Martin Harrington; Ash Howes; Kara DioGuardi	Harrington; Howes	2:54
2.	"Shiver"	Imbruglia; Francis White; Shep Solomon	Stephen Lipson; Harrington^{[a]}; Howes^{[a]}	3:42
3.	"Satisfied"	Daniel Johns	Johns; Paul Mac	3:28
4.	"Counting Down the Days"	Imbruglia; Matt Prime	Johns	4:09
5.	"I Won't Be Lost"	Imbruglia; Harrington; Howes	Harrington; Howes	3:51
6.	"Slow Down"	Imbruglia; White	Eg	3:30
7.	"Sanctuary"	Imbruglia; Gary Clark	Ian Stanley; Clark^{[b]}	3:07
8.	"Perfectly"	Imbruglia; Steve Robson; Solomon; Paul Westcott	Harrington; Howes	3:22
9.	"On the Run"	Imbruglia; Harrington; Howes; DioGuardi	Harrington; Howes	3:37
10.	"Come On Home"	Dan Glendining	Ben Hillier	3:55
11.	"When You're Sleeping"	Imbruglia; Clark	Clark; Harrington^{[a]}; Howes^{[a]}	3:04
12.	"Honeycomb Child"	Imbruglia; David Kosten	Kosten	4:12

Notes

- ^a signifies a co-producer
- ^b signifies an initial producer

== Personnel ==
Credits adapted from the album's liner notes

- Natalie Imbruglia – lead vocals (all tracks), art direction
- Ash Howes – mixing (tracks 1–5, 8, 9, 11), production (tracks 1, 5, 8, 9), co-production (tracks 2, 11), keyboard (tracks 5, 8), bass (track 1)
- Martin Harrington – production (tracks 1, 5, 8, 9), co-production (tracks 2, 11), keyboard (tracks 1, 8), piano & acoustic guitar (track 5)
- Eg White – keyboard & guitar (tracks 2, 6), production, engineering, mixing, programming, drums & bass (track 6)
- Gary Clark – production, engineering, guitar & strings (track 11), initial production (track 7)
- Keith Uddin – engineering (tracks 1, 5, 8, 9, 11), mix engineering (tracks 3, 4), additional engineering (track 2)
- Pete Davis – programming & keyboard (tracks 1, 5, 8, 9)
- Rej Rheinallt ap Gwynedd – bass (tracks 2, 4, 7–10)
- Chuck Sabo – drums (tracks 1, 2, 4, 7, 10)
- Stephen Lipson – production, programming, keyboard, mandolin & guitar (track 2)
- Peredur ap Gwynedd – guitar (tracks 2, 4, 7, 8, 10)
- Daniel Johns – production & backing vocals (tracks 3, 4), guitar (track 3)
- David Kosten – production, mixing, programming, keyboard & strings (track 12)
- Ben Hillier – production, mixing, piano & dulcimer (track 10)
- Seton Daunt – guitar (tracks 1, 5, 8)
- Paul Mac – production, piano & keyboard (track 3)
- Kenny Dickenson – piano (tracks 4, 9), keyboard (track 4)
- John Themis – acoustic guitar (track 1), ethnic instruments (track 7)
- Kim Moyes – drums & glockenspiel (track 3)
- Geoff Dugmore – drums (tracks 5, 8)
- Richard Morris – production assistance & mixing assistance (track 10)
- Heff Moraes – engineering (track 2)
- Rick Willson – guitar (track 2)
- Anton Hagop – engineering (track 3)
- James Haselwood – bass (track 3)
- Julian Hamilton – keyboard (track 3)
- Reece Gilmore – Pro Tools editing (track 3)
- Chris Brown – engineering (track 4)
- Izzy Dunn – cello (track 4)
- Petra Jean Phillipson – backing vocals (track 4)
- Katch Koffee – backing vocals (track 4)
- Richard Jones – bass (track 5)
- Ian Stanley – production (track 7)
- Dave Bascombe – mixing (track 7)
- Danton Supple – engineering (track 7)
- Neil Taylor – guitar (track 7)
- Alison Clark – backing vocals (track 7)
- John Greswell – mandolin (track 10)
- John Sundry – guitar (track 12)
- Drusilla Harris – violin (track 12)
- Roma – art direction
- Steve Stacey – design
- Hugh Goldsmith – A&R
- Andy Stephens Management – management
- Dean Freeman – photography

== Charts ==
=== Weekly charts ===
Chart (2005)	Peak position
Australian Albums (ARIA)	12
Austrian Albums (Ö3 Austria)	35
Belgian Albums (Ultratop Flanders)	59
Belgian Albums (Ultratop Wallonia)	21
Canada Top Albums/CDs (RPM)	96
Dutch Albums (Album Top 100)	50
European Top 100 Albums (Billboard)	8
French Albums (SNEP)	22
German Albums (Offizielle Top 100)	35
Irish Albums (IRMA)	12
Italian Albums (FIMI)	10
Scottish Albums (Official Charts)	2
Spanish Albums (Promusicae)	66
Swiss Albums (Schweizer Hitparade)	9
UK Albums (Official Charts)	1

=== Year-end charts ===
Chart (2005)	Position
UK Albums (OCC)	100

== Certifications ==
Region	Certification	Certified units/sales
Russia (NFPF)	Gold	10,000^{*}
United Kingdom (BPI)	Gold	206,860
^{*} Sales figures based on certification alone.

== Release history ==
List of release dates, showing region, formats, label, and catalog number
Region	Date	Label	Format(s)	Catalog number
United Kingdom	4 April 2005	Brightside Recordings	CD	B0007YH6AG
Australia	11 April 2005	Brightside Recordings	CD	82876679672
Japan	20 April 2005	Sony BMG Japan	CD	BVCP-24064
France	25 April 2005	Brightside Recordings	CD	B0007TF19Y
Canada	9 September 2005	Sony Music Canada Inc.	CD	B0007TF19Y
