= Big Mistake =

1998 single by Natalie Imbruglia

Single by Natalie Imbruglia

from the album Left of the Middle
- B-side: "Something Better"; "Tomorrow Morning"; "I've Been Watching You"
- Released: 2 March 1998
- Length: 4:34 (album version); 3:54 (radio edit)
- Label: RCA; BMG
- Songwriters: Natalie Imbruglia; Mark Goldenberg
- Producer: Mark Goldenberg

Natalie Imbruglia singles chronology
"Torn" (1997)	"Big Mistake" (1998)	"Wishing I Was There" (1998)

Music video
- "Big Mistake" on YouTube

"Big Mistake" is a song by Australian singer Natalie Imbruglia. It was written by Imbruglia and Mark Goldenberg for Imbruglia's debut album Left of the Middle (1997). The song was released as the album's second single on 2 March 1998 by RCA Records and BMG. Although less successful than "Torn", "Big Mistake" still proved to be a hit in certain territories, reaching number two in Iceland and the United Kingdom, number five in Spain and number six in Australia. It was not released in the United States or Canada.

== Critical reception ==
British magazine Music Week gave "Big Mistake" five out of five, writing, "Swooning and sultry vocals, more Morissette than Texas, and a dream of guitar song to challenge Madonna for the number one spot. And she wrote it herself."

== Music video ==
The music video for "Big Mistake" was directed by Alison Maclean and filmed in Barcelona, Spain. It features Imbruglia walking through the streets of Barcelona while being pursued by a male suitor, and begins with her walking, oblivious to things that are happening around her. Meanwhile, the man follows her down the street with a bouquet of flowers. While in pursuit of Imbruglia, several obstacles prevent him from reaching her. The video concludes with her riding away from her suitor in the back of a stranger's red pickup truck. The video was inspired by the traffic accident scene in Jean-Luc Godard's film Week End.

== Track listings ==
- Australian CD single
1. "Big Mistake" – 4:35
2. "Torn" (acoustic MTV Unplugged) – 3:06
3. "Something Better" – 4:05
4. "Tomorrow Morning" – 3:00
- UK CD1
1. "Big Mistake" – 4:35
2. "Something Better" – 4:05
3. "Torn" (acoustic MTV Unplugged) – 3:05
4. "Big Mistake" (video)
- UK CD2
1. "Big Mistake" – 4:35
2. "I've Been Watching You" – 4:03
3. "Tomorrow Morning" – 3:00
- UK cassette single
1. "Big Mistake" – 4:35
2. "Something Better" – 4:05
- European CD single
1. "Big Mistake" – 4:35
2. "Torn" (acoustic MTV Unplugged) – 3:06

== Charts ==
=== Weekly charts ===
Chart (1998)	Peak position
Australia (ARIA)	6
Belgium (Ultratop 50 Flanders)	19
Estonia (Eesti Top 20)	6
Europe (Eurochart Hot 100)	27
Iceland (Íslenski Listinn Topp 40)	2
Ireland (IRMA)	17
Italy (Musica e dischi)	11
Netherlands (Dutch Top 40)	37
Netherlands (Single Top 100)	43
New Zealand (Recorded Music NZ)	19
Scotland Singles (Official Charts)	2
Spain (AFYVE)	5
Sweden (Sverigetopplistan)	24
UK Singles (Official Charts)	2

=== Year-end charts ===
Chart (1998)	Position
Australia (ARIA)	42
Iceland (Íslenski Listinn Topp 40)	9
UK Singles (OCC)	91

== Certifications ==
Region	Certification	Certified units/sales
Australia (ARIA)	Gold	35,000^{^}
United Kingdom (BPI)	Silver	200,000^{^}
^{^} Shipments figures based on certification alone.

== Release history ==
Region	Date	Format(s)	Label(s)	Ref.
United Kingdom	2 March 1998	CD	RCA; BMG	
Sweden	20 March 1998	CD	RCA; BMG	
