= Counting Down the Days (song) =

2005 single by Natalie Imbruglia

- CD1 cover

Single by Natalie Imbruglia

from the album Counting Down the Days
- B-side: "Only You"; "What's the Good in Goodbye"
- Released: 25 July 2005
- Studio: RAK, Olympic (London, England); Compton Way, Jacobs (Farnham, England); AM (Chennai, India)
- Length: 4:09 (album version); 3:09 (single version)
- Label: Brightside
- Songwriters: Natalie Imbruglia; Matt Prime
- Producer: Daniel Johns

Natalie Imbruglia singles chronology
"Shiver" (2005)	"Counting Down the Days" (2005)	"Glorious" (2007)

Alternative cover
- CD2 cover

Music video
- "Counting Down the Days" on YouTube

"Counting Down the Days" is the second and final single from Australian singer Natalie Imbruglia's third album, Counting Down the Days (2005). The song reached number 23 in the UK and number 52 in Australia. There are two versions of the song: the first one is the album version found on Counting Down the Days, while the second one is the single version found on the CD single. The main difference between the single and album versions is that the single version does not have a pre-chorus.

The song's lyrics were inspired by Imbruglia's relationship with then-husband Daniel Johns, and the yearning she felt for him while their respective work commitments separated them. They would eventually divorce in early 2008. Johns produced the song.

== Track listings ==
Australian CD single

1. "Counting Down the Days" (Imbruglia, Matt Prime) – 3:09
2. "What's the Good in Goodbye" (Imbruglia, Phil Thornalley, Mark Hewerdine) – 3:57
3. "Counting Down the Days" (Imbruglia, Matt Prime) – 4:09
4. "Counting Down the Days" (video)

UK CD1 and European CD single

1. "Counting Down the Days" (Imbruglia, Matt Prime) – 3:09
2. "Only You" (Imbruglia, Kara DioGuardi, Martin Harrington, Ash Howes) – 3:32

UK CD2

1. "Counting Down the Days" (Imbruglia, Matt Prime) – 3:09
2. "What's the Good in Goodbye" (Imbruglia, Thornalley, Hewerdine) – 3:57
3. "Counting Down the Days" (video)

== Charts ==
=== Weekly charts ===
Chart (2005)	Peak position
Australia (ARIA)	52
European Hot 100 Singles (Billboard)	71
Hungary (Rádiós Top 40)	30
Ireland (IRMA)	35
Italy (FIMI)	25
Scottish Singles Sales (Official Charts)	19
Switzerland (Schweizer Hitparade)	90
UK Singles (Official Charts)	23
Ukraine Airplay (TopHit)	182

=== Year-end charts ===
Chart (2005)	Position
Hungary (Rádiós Top 40)	98

== Release history ==
Region	Date	Format(s)	Label(s)	Ref.
United Kingdom	25 July 2005	CD	Brightside	
Australia	22 August 2005	CD	Brightside	
