= Come to Life (Natalie Imbruglia album) =

2009 studio album

Studio album by Natalie Imbruglia
- Released: 2 October 2009
- Recorded: 2008–2009
- Studios: The Bakery (London, England); Air Studios (London, England)
- Genre: Pop
- Length: 37:57
- Labels: Malabar; Island
- Producers: Rik Simpson; Ben Hillier; Dave McCracken; Gary Clark; Jamie Hartman; Paul Harris; Sheppard Solomon; Brian Eno

Natalie Imbruglia chronology
Glorious: The Singles 97–07 (2007)	Come to Life (2009)	Male (2015)

Singles from Come to Life
- 1. "Want" Released: 28 September 2009

Professional ratings
Review scores
Source	Rating
AllMusic	4/5 stars
Sputnikmusic	(3/5)
Yahoo! Music UK	6/10 stars

Come to Life is the fourth studio album released by Australian singer-songwriter Natalie Imbruglia. It was initially released by Island Records on 2 October 2009, and later was the first album released on Imbruglia's self-funded label, Malabar Records.

== Songwriting ==
Although recording for the album began in 2007, during promotion for the release of Glorious: The Singles 1997–2007, tracks "Scars" and "My God" were rumoured to have been recorded in 2006. The album took nearly three years to complete. In February 2009, The Sun newspaper rumoured that Imbruglia was collaborating with Chris Martin from Coldplay, and it was later confirmed by Martin himself and people involved in the recording process that he had worked with Imbruglia on a "string of tracks".

Chris Martin wrote the song "Fun" for Natalie. "When he sang it to me, I almost did one of those ugly cries. But I held it together. That's the crazy thing - he wrote it, not me. Who knows what Chris was thinking, you would have to ask him about that. But I thought it was a stunning, beautiful love song". The song "Lukas", produced by Brian Eno and Rik Simpson, was confirmed as an out-take from the recording sessions of Coldplay's fourth studio album, Viva la Vida or Death and All His Friends. Martin also worked with Imbruglia on "Want", with his voice echoing at the end of the song. "Coldplay write so much material it's quite ridiculous how many songs they have, some of which never get finished because Chris Martin is a bit of a mad genius," Imbruglia explained.

In April 2009, Imbruglia stated the following in an interview: "I get frustrated because I’d like to produce more work... It’s something that bugs me about myself, but I don’t really know any other way. And I’m not motivated by money, so I need to get things done right. I feel the same creative buzz I felt when I first started my career... It's just fun and artistic and creative and all the things it should be. There's still a lot of depth to the songs... It just sounds fresher to me. I've tried different things - there's more electronic stuff in there, and that's different for me, more dance beats. There's a freedom overall, and a sense of confidence. It's slightly less introspective..." The album "combines dark, driving beats and gorgeously wistful ballads".

== Release ==
The album was first released via on Island Records on 2 October 2009 in Australia. It was announced that the release of the album in the United Kingdom would be delayed so that Imbruglia could concentrate on her duties as a judge on the Australian version of The X Factor franchise. The album was eventually made available in the United Kingdom on 14 February 2010 by Amazon. In 2020, the album became available for streaming in its entirety on Spotify and its tracks were made available on YouTube by Universal Music.

== Singles ==
- "Wild About It" was released as a promotional single. A music video was filmed for the song in London, England, and was directed by Mike Baldwin. The video features cameo appearances by British comedians Alan Carr and David Walliams.
- "Want" was officially released as the album's lead single on 28 September 2009. Released only as a digital download, the track reached number six on the Italian singles chart and number 88 on the UK singles chart.
- "Scars" was intended to become the second single from the album, due to be released on 26 April 2010, however, due to contractual issues with the record label, was cancelled. It was announced three weeks later the single would actually be released on 5 July, nearly a year after the previous single, but once again, the release was cancelled. At some point in 2010, there was a limited digital release available on Amazon MP3 as a promotional single, but it was quickly taken down.

== Chart performance ==
Come to Life entered the Australian albums chart at #67 on 19 October 2009, making it Imbruglia's worst performing album to date. It sold 740 copies in its first week of release. In its second week, it dropped to #89, spending only two weeks in the top 100. In Switzerland, the album peaked at #70 on 18 October 2009.

== Track listing ==
No.	Title	Writer(s)	Producer(s)	Length
1.	"My God"	Natalie Imbruglia; Crispin Hunt	Ben Hillier	4:04
2.	"Lukas"	Guy Berryman; Jonny Buckland; Will Champion; Chris Martin	Brian Eno; Rik Simpson	3:50
3.	"Fun"	Berryman; Buckland; Champion; Martin	Ken Nelson	4:22
4.	"Twenty"	Imbruglia; Sheppard Solomon	Hillier	3:57
5.	"Scars"	Imbruglia; Jamie Hartman	Simpson; Jon Hopkins; Leo Abrahams	3:32
6.	"Want"	Imbruglia; Kat Kourtney; Gary Clark; Martin	Simpson	4:20
7.	"WYUT"	Imbruglia; Alain Johannes; Natasha Shneider	Johannes	3:20
8.	"Cameo"	Imbruglia; Hillier; Dave McCracken	McCracken; Hillier	3:13
9.	"All the Roses"	Imbruglia; Clark	Hillier	3:29
10.	"Wild About It"	Imbruglia; Hillier; McCracken	McCracken; Hillier	4:08

Japanese edition bonus track
No.	Title	Writer(s)	Producer(s)	Length
11.	"Flirting"	Imbruglia; Siddhartha Khosla	Hillier	5:00

Digital edition bonus track
No.	Title	Writer(s)	Producer(s)	Length
11.	"Want" (The Shapeshifters Nocturnal remix)	Imbruglia; Johns; Kourtney; Clark; Martin	Simpson	6:48

International digital edition bonus track
No.	Title	Writer(s)	Producer(s)	Length
11.	"Want" (Blunt Laser remix)	Imbruglia; Johns; Kourtney; Clark; Martin	Simpson	5:22

== Charts ==
Chart (2009)	Peak position
Australian Albums (ARIA)	67
Italian Albums (FIMI)	42
Russian Albums (NFPF)	25
Swiss Albums (Schweizer Hitparade)	70

== Release history ==
List of release dates, showing region, and formats
Region	Date	Label
Ireland	2 October 2009	Island Records
Austria	2 October 2009	Island Records
Italy	2 October 2009	Island Records
New Zealand	9 October 2009	Universal Music Australia
Australia	9 October 2009	Universal Music Australia
Europe	12 October 2009	Island Records
Japan	14 October 2009	Universal Music
Mexico	20 October 2009	Malabar Records
Germany	6 November 2009	Island Records
Various – Digital	28 January 2020	Island Records
