= Instant Crush =

2013 single by Daft Punk featuring Julian Casablancas

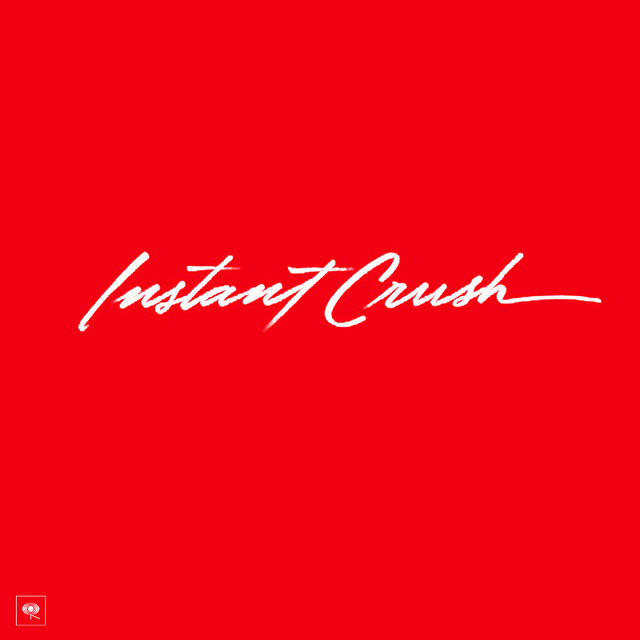

Single by Daft Punk featuring Julian Casablancas

from the album Random Access Memories
- Released: 22 November 2013
- Recorded: 2010–2012
- Genre: Synth-pop; electronic rock
- Length: 5:37 (album version); 3:29 (radio edit)
- Label: Columbia
- Songwriters: Thomas Bangalter; Guy-Manuel de Homem-Christo; Julian Casablancas
- Producers: Daft Punk; Julian Casablancas

Daft Punk singles chronology
"Doin' It Right" (2013)	"Instant Crush" (2013)	"Give Life Back to Music" (2014)

Julian Casablancas singles chronology
"Out of the Blue" (2010)	"Instant Crush" (2013)	"Boy/Girl" (2015)

Music video
- "Instant Crush" on YouTube

"Instant Crush" is a song written, produced, and performed by the French electronic music duo Daft Punk featuring the American singer Julian Casablancas. It was released as the fourth single from Daft Punk's fourth album, Random Access Memories (2013), on 22 November 2013. It was number 58 on Rolling Stone magazine's 100 Best Songs of 2013 list.

== Production ==
While working on the Tron: Legacy soundtrack in 2010, Daft Punk met with Casablancas in their studio through a mutual friend, Warren Fu. The duo, who are fans of Casablancas' band The Strokes, presented him with an instrumental demo track intended for use on Daft Punk's next album. Casablancas responded favorably to the demo upon listening to it and subsequently agreed to provide accompanying vocals, forming the basis for what would become "Instant Crush". He later noted that he combined the compositions of two separate Daft Punk demos, which serve as the verse and chorus respectively.

Regarding the lyrics, Casablancas recalled that Daft Punk approached him with "the whole story" of what the duo wanted to achieve. At one point he wondered whether the song should be called "Summer Crush" based on how Daft Punk described the idea. The concept involved reflecting on the childhood memory of meeting a girl, but missing the opportunity to be with her. Casablancas initially based his lyrics on this story in conjunction with writing provided by Paul Williams, but felt that the result was "flat". He subsequently discarded the lines in favor of ones that he spontaneously sang to fit the structure of "Instant Crush", and expressed that doing so conveyed Daft Punk's concept better.

The song as it appears on the album was co-produced and sung by Casablancas, who also performed lead guitar. Daft Punk played additional guitar on "Instant Crush" as well as keyboards and synthesizers. Nathan East performed on bass guitar while John "JR" Robinson played drums and Quinn provided percussion. Critic John Balfe considered the Casablancas performance "appropriately Strokes-ish, even if his trademark drawl is fed quite substantially through a vocoder." De Homem-Christo noted that while "It is true that it is not his usual register, it is the way Julian reacted to the track so for us it is even more exciting."

== Music video ==
Warren Fu directed the music video for "Instant Crush" with production by Daft Arts. He was previously responsible for the album artwork of Random Access Memories, and co-directed the video for "Lose Yourself to Dance". Tony Gardner and Alterian, Inc. designed character effects for "Instant Crush" and created statues from wax and fiberglass. Gardner previously directed Daft Punk's music video for "The Prime Time of Your Life" and was involved in the feature film Daft Punk's Electroma as well as the Alive 2006/2007 tour. Clips from the "Instant Crush" video were released exclusively on French news channel BFM TV on December 5, 2013. The full music video was released on Vevo the following day. The music video was shot on 35mm film in a 4:3 aspect ratio and was inspired by Hans Christian Andersen's fairy tale "The Steadfast Tin Soldier" as well as The Twilight Zone television series. Portions of the video were filmed in Los Angeles at the Doheny Mansion.

The video depicts the love story of two wax figures on display at an exhibition hall: a French soldier of the Napoleonic Wars who bears a resemblance to Casablancas, and a female peasant on display across from him. The video is interspersed with shots of Casablancas singing from a circular multi-level stage that is visually similar to the stage featured in "Around the World". The soldier statue has a vision of himself and the peasant statue standing in the center of the hall together. After having spent years in the hall, different models began replacing the older models; employees are shown switching a diving suit model for an astronaut model. Eventually, the male figure is taken away from the female one and put in storage in the basement. Years pass as the soldier figure stands inside his box alone, watching the sun come through a window, lighting up archived artwork depicting couples embracing. Later, a fire breaks out in the basement from a faulty fuse, igniting cleaning rags left on the ground. As the fire burns, the soldier once again has visions of him and the female statue while one of his legs starts melting, causing him to fall to the floor. The fire causes some nearby shelving to collapse, revealing the peasant figure has also been archived; she falls to the floor as well, next to the soldier. There, they lie beside each other as the heat causes their hands to melt together, eventually becoming a molten puddle of wax and clothing, merging as one. A shelf in the video is briefly shown holding the Daft Punk robot helmets, which were originally engineered by Gardner and Alterian.

CD promo

1. "Instant Crush" (radio edit) – 3:30
2. "Instant Crush" (album version) – 5:38

== Personnel ==
Credits adapted from Random Access Memories liner notes.

- Julian Casablancas – vocals, co-production, lead guitar
- Daft Punk – synthesizer, keyboards, rhythm guitar
- Nathan East – bass
- John "JR" Robinson – drums
- Quinn – percussion

== Commercial performance ==
"Instant Crush" debuted at numbers 29 and 37 on the singles charts of France and Sweden respectively following the release of Random Access Memories, spending sixteen weeks on the former chart. It also entered at number 198 on the UK Singles Chart and at number 16 on the United States Billboard Bubbling Under Hot 100 Singles chart.

=== Weekly charts ===
Chart (2013–2014)	Peak position
Australia Streaming (ARIA)	7
Belgium (Ultratop 50 Flanders)	23
Belgium (Ultratop Flanders Dance)	5
Belgium (Ultratop 50 Wallonia)	5
Belgium (Ultratop Wallonia Dance)	5
France (SNEP)	4
Lebanon (The Official Lebanese Top 20)	10
Mexico Ingles Airplay (Billboard)	44
Slovakia Airplay (ČNS IFPI)	77
South Korea (Gaon International Chart)	8
Sweden (Sverigetopplistan)	37
Switzerland (Schweizer Hitparade)	40
UK Singles (Official Charts Company)	198
US Bubbling Under Hot 100 (Billboard)	16
US Hot Dance/Electronic Songs (Billboard)	20

=== Year-end charts ===
Chart (2013)	Position
France (SNEP)	177
US Hot Dance/Electronic Songs (Billboard)	42

Chart (2014)	Position
Belgium (Ultratop Flanders)	97
Belgium (Ultratop Wallonia)	27
France (SNEP)	16

== Certifications and sales ==
Region	Certification	Certified units/sales
Canada (Music Canada)	Platinum	80,000^{‡}
Denmark (IFPI Danmark)	Gold	45,000^{‡}
France (SNEP)	Gold	71,300
Italy (FIMI)	Gold	25,000^{‡}
Mexico (AMPROFON)	Platinum	60,000^{*}
New Zealand (RMNZ)	Platinum	30,000^{‡}
Spain (Promusicae)	Gold	30,000^{‡}
United Kingdom (BPI)	Silver	200,000^{‡}
United States (RIAA)	Platinum	1,000,000^{‡}
^{*} Sales figures based on certification alone.^{‡} Sales+streaming figures based on certification alone.

== Release history ==
On 20 November 2013, Sony Music announced that "Instant Crush" would be released as the next single from Random Access Memories, serving as the fourth overall single from the album. It was distributed to radio stations in Italy two days following the announcement, and it was also released in Poland the same week.

Region	Date	Radio format	Label
Italy	22 November 2013	Contemporary hit radio	Sony
United States	6 January 2014	Triple A radio	Columbia
United States	7 January 2014	Modern rock / alternative radio	Columbia

== Natalie Imbruglia version ==
"Instant Crush"

Single by Natalie Imbruglia

from the album Male
- Released: 23 March 2015 (US)
- Recorded: January 2014
- Genre: Pop rock; acoustic
- Length: 3:26 (single edit)
- Label: Portrait; Sony
- Songwriters: Thomas Bangalter; Guy-Manuel de Homem-Christo; Julian Casablancas
- Producer: Billy Mann

Natalie Imbruglia singles chronology
"Want" (2009)	"Instant Crush" (2015)	"Build It Better" (2021)

Music video
- "Instant Crush" on YouTube

In 2015, Australian singer Natalie Imbruglia covered the song for her fifth studio album Male. The song was chosen as the lead single and was released in March 2015. Imbruglia's version was recorded in New York with Billy Mann.

=== Music video ===
A 1950s style music video was shot in London on 10 March 2015 by director Joe Stephenson.

=== Charts ===
Chart (2015)	Peak position
France (SNEP)	150

=== Release history ===
Region	Date	Label	Format	Catalogue
Canada	23 March 2015	Portrait	Digital download	977282806
United States	23 March 2015	Portrait	Digital download	977282806
Worldwide	May–July 2015	Sony	Digital download	977282806
Australia	14 August 2015	Sony	Digital download	977282806
New Zealand	14 August 2015	Sony	Digital download	977282806
