= Glorious (Natalie Imbruglia song) =

2007 single by Natalie Imbruglia

Single by Natalie Imbruglia

from the album Glorious: The Singles 97–07
- B-side: "That Girl"
- Released: 27 August 2007
- Recorded: 2006
- Genre: Pop rock
- Length: 3:25
- Label: Brightside Recordings
- Songwriters: Crispin Hunt, Natalie Imbruglia
- Producer: Crispin Hunt

Natalie Imbruglia singles chronology
"Counting Down the Days" (2005)	"Glorious" (2007)	"Want" (2009)

Music video
- "Glorious" on YouTube

"Glorious" is the only single taken from Glorious: The Singles 97–07, the greatest hits compilation by Natalie Imbruglia. The music video for "Glorious" was directed by Frank Borin (Red Hot Chili Peppers, Eminem, Good Charlotte), and roaded in California. The video is inspired by the movie Y Tu Mamá También, in which Imbruglia collaborated before in the soundtrack, with the song "Cold Air", and follows Natalie and friends on a roadtrip through Mexico. "But instead of filming it in Mexico, I ended up in the California desert in 45C," she said.

== Track listing ==
1. "Glorious" (Crispin Hunt, Natalie Imbruglia) – 3:25
2. "That Girl" (Natalie Imbruglia, Martin Terefe, John Kennedy) – 3:26

Glorious EP

1. "Glorious" (Crispin Hunt, Natalie Imbruglia) – 3:25
2. "That Girl" (Natalie Imbruglia, Martin Terefe, John Kennedy) – 3:26
3. "Identify" (Billy Corgan, Mike Garson, Nigel Godrich) – 4:08
4. "Glorious (Live)" (Crispin Hunt, Natalie Imbruglia) – 3:35

== Charts ==
Chart (2007)	Peak position
Australian Digital Singles Chart	38
Belgium (Ultratip Bubbling Under Flanders)	10
Belgium (Ultratip Bubbling Under Wallonia)	10
Czech Republic Airplay (ČNS IFPI)	40
European Hot 100 Singles (Billboard)	64
Ireland (IRMA)	50
Italy (FIMI)	9
Scottish Singles Chart	15
Slovakia Airplay (ČNS IFPI)	10
Switzerland (Schweizer Hitparade)	92
UK Singles (OCC)	23

== Release history ==
Country	Release date
Australia	27 August 2007
United Kingdom	27 August 2007
Germany	14 September 2007
United States	29 October 2007
