= Wishing I Was There =

1998 single by Natalie Imbruglia

Single by Natalie Imbruglia

from the album Left of the Middle
- B-side: "Why"; "Impressed"
- Released: 25 May 1998
- Length: 4:25 (single/radio edit); 3:50 (album version)
- Label: RCA; BMG
- Songwriters: Natalie Imbruglia; Phil Thornalley; Colin Campsie
- Producer: Phil Thornalley

Natalie Imbruglia singles chronology
"Big Mistake" (1998)	"Wishing I Was There" (1998)	"Smoke" (1998)

Audio
- "Wishing I Was There" on YouTube

"Wishing I Was There" is a song by Australian singer-songwriter Natalie Imbruglia, released on 25 May 1998 as the third single from her debut album, Left of the Middle (1997). The track was produced by Phil Thornalley and was co-written by Imbruglia, Thornalley and Colin Campsie. The single reached number five in Canada, Hungary, and Iceland, became a top-20 hit in the United Kingdom, and entered the top 30 in Imbruglia's native Australia.

== Background and reception ==
On 25 May 1998, RCA Records released "Wishing I Was There" as the third single from Left of the Middle. Prior to this song's release, Imbruglia's first two singles, "Torn" and "Big Mistake" were major chart hits during late 1997 and early 1998. "Wishing I Was There" followed, but was less successful than her first two singles, reaching number 19 on the UK Singles Chart, number 24 in Australia, and number 40 in New Zealand. In Canada, the song reached number five on the RPM 100 Hit Tracks chart in September 1998, becoming Imbruglia's second hit there after "Torn", which spent 12 weeks at number one between April and July.

In the United States, the song was not allowed to chart on the Billboard Hot 100 due to rules in place at the time, but it reached number 25 on the Billboard Hot 100 Airplay chart, where "Torn" had stayed at number one for 11 weeks. It also peaked at number 13 on the Adult Top 40 chart and number 15 on the Mainstream Top 40 chart. Elsewhere, the song charted in Belgium, France, Germany, and the Netherlands, but did not reach the top 50 in any of those countries. In Italy, the song reached number 27.

== Composition ==
"Wishing I Was There" is a song with an album version length of three minutes and 52 seconds and a single version of four minutes and 25 seconds. The song is set in the key of F major and has a medium tempo – 96 beats per minute – with a piano, guitar and vocal arrangement. Imbruglia is co-credited, with Phil Thornalley and Colin Campsie, for both lyrics and music.

== Music video ==
The music video was shot in parts of New York. Towards the end of the video, the now destroyed World Trade Center complex and parts of lower Manhattan are featured.

== Track listings ==
Australian and Japanese CD single

1. "Wishing I Was There" – 4:25
2. "Why" – 4:18
3. "Big Mistake" (MTV live version) – 5:07
4. "Wishing I Was There" (Transister remix) – 3:33

UK CD1

1. "Wishing I Was There" – 4:25
2. "Big Mistake" (live version on MTV) – 5:07
3. "Why" – 4:18

UK CD2

1. "Wishing I Was There" – 4:25
2. "Wishing I Was There" (Transister remix) – 3:33
3. "Impressed" (Tim Bran remix) – 4:08

UK cassette single and European CD single

1. "Wishing I Was There" – 4:25
2. "Why" – 4:18

== Charts ==
=== Weekly charts ===
Chart (1998)	Peak position
Australia (ARIA)	24
Belgium (Ultratip Bubbling Under Flanders)	5
Canada Top Singles (RPM)	5
Canada Adult Contemporary (RPM)	21
Estonia (Eesti Top 20)	9
Europe (Eurochart Hot 100)	73
France (SNEP)	56
Germany (GfK)	68
Hungary (Mahasz)	5
Iceland (Íslenski Listinn Topp 40)	5
Netherlands (Dutch Top 40 Tipparade)	19
Netherlands (Single Top 100)	77
New Zealand (Recorded Music NZ)	40
Scottish Singles Sales (Official Charts)	18
UK Singles (Official Charts)	19
US Radio Songs (Billboard)	25
US Adult Pop Airplay (Billboard)	13
US Alternative Airplay (Billboard)	26
US Pop Airplay (Billboard)	15

=== Year-end charts ===
Chart (1998)	Position
Canada Top Singles (RPM)	54
Iceland (Íslenski Listinn Topp 40)	32
US Adult Top 40 (Billboard)	32
US Mainstream Top 40 (Billboard)	59

== Release history ==
Region	Date	Format(s)	Label(s)	Ref.
United Kingdom	25 May 1998	CD; cassette	RCA; BMG	
Sweden	1 June 1998	CD	RCA; BMG	
United States	1 June 1998	Modern rock radio	RCA	
Japan	24 June 1998	CD	RCA; BMG	
United States	14 July 1998	Contemporary hit radio	RCA	
