= Left of the Middle =

Studio album by Natalie Imbruglia
- Released: 24 November 1997
- Recorded: 1996–1997
- Genre: Alternative pop
- Length: 50:03
- Label: RCA
- Producers: Matt Bronleewe; Mark Goldenberg; Phil Thornalley; Andy Wright; Assistant: Gareth Parton; Nigel Godrich

Natalie Imbruglia chronology
Left of the Middle (1997)	White Lilies Island (2001)

Alternative cover

Singles from Left of the Middle
- 1. "Torn" Released: 27 October 1997; 2. "Big Mistake" Released: 2 March 1998; 3. "Wishing I Was There" Released: 25 May 1998; 4. "Smoke" Released: 5 October 1998

Left of the Middle is the debut studio album by Australian singer Natalie Imbruglia. It was released by RCA Records on 24 November 1997 in the United Kingdom, followed by most international territories in early 1998. Primarily writing and recording the album in the UK, Imbruglia worked with a number of English producers, including Phil Thornalley, Andy Wright and Nigel Godrich, and at the final stage of the album production, she traveled to Nashville in the United States and co-wrote songs, including the b-side "Why?", with American songwriter Matt Bronleewe. Left of the Middle is an alternative pop album which incorporates elements of electronic sound. The lead single "Torn" (1997) was a worldwide commercial success and has since been named as one of the Best Songs of 1990s by several publications, including Rolling Stone, and Pitchfork.

Commercially, Left of the Middle topped the album music chart in Australia as well as charting within the top five in the UK and top ten in the US, and has sold over seven million copies worldwide. The album won Best Australian Debut Album and Best Pop Release at the 12th ARIA Music Awards in 1998 and was nominated for Best Pop Vocal Album at the 41st Annual Grammy Awards in 1999. In late 2022, Imbruglia toured the UK to celebrate 25 year anniversary of the album.

== Background ==
In 1996, commercial success of female alternative singers, such as Sheryl Crow at A&M and Alanis Morissette at Warner Bros. had prompted other major record labels to seek similar acts, including RCA Records. Around the same time, Phil Thornalley, who had been trying to reproduce his co-written song "Torn" for several years met Imbruglia, they finally finished the demo together, and successfully impressed Anne Barret, Imbruglia's future manager, who took and played the demo to Jeremy Marsh, BMG Executive and eventually signed Imbruglia to RCA Records. Imbruglia co-wrote all the songs on the album, except for Torn and Don’t You Think. She admitted that she was really insecure when she was making Left of the Middle, and described that prior to recording sessions, she would over-prepare by seeking inspiration from pre-written poetry excessively.

The track "Pigeons and Crumbs", written by Mark Goldenberg and Imbruglia, explores the struggles of a person in his/her early twenties living in the big city or big community. "City", written by Imbruglia and Thornalley, refers to false friends who disappeared when hardship came along. In addition to writing and recording in the UK, Imbruglia travelled to Nashville and collaborated with Matt Bronleewe and wrote "Smoke", which tells the story about a child whose needs are not being met by its parents. Five songs on the album were mixed by Radiohead's frequent collaborator, Nigel Godrich, and seven songs on the album were produced by Phil Thornalley.

== Singles ==
- "Torn" was released on 27 October 1997 in the United Kingdom as the lead single from the album. It debuted and peaked at number two on the UK Singles Chart, and eventually sold over one million copies in the country alone. "Torn" also peaked at number two on Australia's ARIA Singles Chart. Following the commercial performance in the international market, "Torn" made its debut on the United States' Billboard Radio Songs Chart on 14 February 1998 and eventually reached number one on 16 May 1998. The song stayed atop the chart for 11 consecutive weeks and also topped the Billboard Adult Top 40 Chart for 14 consecutive weeks.
- "Big Mistake" was released on 8 March 1998 in the United Kingdom, and debuted at number two on the UK Singles Chart and number six on the ARIA Singles Chart. "Big Mistake" was not promoted in the US as "Torn" was still gaining popularity there.
- "Wishing I Was There" was released on 31 May 1998 as the third single from the album in the UK. It peaked at number 19 on the UK Singles Chart, and number 24 on the ARIA Singles Chart. The song was promoted in the United States as the second single with the release of the US version of the music video. It peaked at number 25 on the Billboard Radio Songs Chart on 26 September 1998, and at number 13 on the Billboard Adult Top 40 Chart on 19 September 1998. This single features a non-album track "Why?", written with Matt Bronleewe during the Nashville sessions.
- "Smoke" was released on 5 October 1998 in the United Kingdom as the fourth and last single from the album, peaking at number five on the UK Singles Chart, and number 42 on the ARIA Singles Chart.

== Critical reception ==
Professional ratings
Review scores
Source	Rating
AllMusic	4/5 stars
Entertainment Weekly	C+
The Guardian	3/5 stars
Los Angeles Times	3/4 stars
Music Week	5/5 stars
NME	7/10 stars
Q	2/5 stars
Rolling Stone	2/5 stars
Smash Hits	3/5 stars
The Village Voice	C+

Critics were divided on Left of the Middle, with several praising Natalie Imbruglia's emotive voice, pop appeal, and experimentation, while others criticized the album for lack of originality, overproduction, and failing to fully realize her potential. Greg Prato from AllMusic gave the album a positive review, stating that "some of the material will be seen as pop fluff by certain listeners, but fans of popular latter-day female artists like Paula Cole, Sheryl Crow, and Meredith Brooks will find Imbruglia's debut most enjoyable", and praised Imbruglia's willingness to experiment with electronic sound. Sara Scribner from the Los Angeles Times gave the album 3 out of 4 stars, saying that the album is a "good pop record to break up to" and "Imbruglia dispels doubts with a smoky, believable voice tinged with just enough real-life ambivalence and anger". She found that "producer Phil Thornalley's talent for conjuring beats with attitude doesn’t hurt either."

Smash Hits wrote that "there are some brill tracks on the album, some as good as "Torn," but some weaker ones as well, and it's all a bit, well, serious, a bit anguished and breathless: Still, when Nat's good, she’s very, very good and if you liked her big chart hit, there's plenty on this album to keep you happy." Q critic Steve Malins found that Left of the Middle was "quietly impressive on first listen. However, with the exception of "Torn and Smoke," the furrowed, emotionally reserved songwriting has created a claustrophobic debut, which reveals that Imbruglia still has more skins to shed before she reaches her undoubted potential." However, Rob Sheffield from Rolling Stone gave the album a negative review, with 2 out of 5 stars, saying that on her album, too many cooks spoil the broth, adding rock guitars and industrial clank beats that have nothing to do with her fey charms. Mark Bautz from Entertainment Weekly also gave the album a negative review, highlighted the lack of originality, outdated production and its sonic similarity to Rickie Lee and Alanis Morissette. Writing for The Village Voice, Robert Christgau found that "compared to the diluted simple syrup of Swirl 360 or the teen-idol rappabilly of Jimmy Ray, Imbruglia's modern pop is Rumours [but] under all their state-of-the-studio-art, her competent songs are no more distinctive than the competent songs of hundreds of less pretty women."

== Commercial performance ==
In the United Kingdom, Left of the Middle debuted and peaked at number five on the UK Albums Chart on 6 December 1997, spending 15 weeks in the Top 10 and a total of 101 non-consecutive weeks in the Top 100 until 27 January 2001. It eventually sold 1.2 million copies in the UK, and has been certified triple platinum by British Phonographic Industry (BPI).

In Australia, the album debuted at number three on 15 March 1998, before falling to number 18 the next week. It slowly climbed the chart in the following weeks and reached the number one spot in August 1998, spending a total of 61 weeks in the Top 50 until 1999. Left of the Middle was ranked five on the ARIA Top 100 Albums of 1998, and 68 on the ARIA Top 100 Albums of 1999. It has been certified five times platinum by Australian Recording Industry Association (ARIA) and sold over 350,000 copies.

In the United States, the album was released a week after Imbruglia's performance on Saturday Night Live, and debuted at number ten on the Billboard 200 Chart on 28 March 1998. It spent 52 consecutive weeks on the chart and sold over two million copies, and was certified double platinum by Recording Industry Association of America (RIAA).

Left of the Middle has sold over seven million copies worldwide.

== Track listing ==
Left of the Middle – Standard edition
No.	Title	Writer(s)	Producer(s)	Length
1.	"Torn"	Scott Cutler; Anne Preven; Phil Thornalley	Thornalley	4:04
2.	"One More Addiction"	Natalie Imbruglia; Dave Munday; Thornalley	Thornalley	3:30
3.	"Big Mistake"	Imbruglia; Mark Goldenberg	Goldenberg	4:35
4.	"Leave Me Alone"	Imbruglia; Andy Wright	Wright	4:21
5.	"Wishing I Was There"	Imbruglia; Colin Campsie; Thornalley	Thornalley	3:52
6.	"Smoke"	Imbruglia; Matt Bronleewe	Bronleewe	4:37
7.	"Pigeons and Crumbs"	Imbruglia; Goldenberg	Goldenberg	5:21
8.	"Don't You Think?"	Campsie; Thornalley	Thornalley; Mark Plati^{[a]}	3:55
9.	"Impressed"	Imbruglia; Rick Palombi; Nick Trevisik	Bronleewe	4:47
10.	"Intuition"	Imbruglia; Munday; Thornalley	Thornalley	3:22
11.	"City"	Imbruglia; Thornalley	Thornalley	4:34
12.	"Left of the Middle"	Imbruglia; Steve Booker	Thornalley	3:46
Total length:				50:03

An alternate pressing of the album switches the order of "Wishing I Was There" and "Intuition".

Left of the Middle – Japanese bonus tracks
No.	Title	Writer(s)	Producer(s)	Length
13.	"Frightened Child"	Imbruglia; Munday; Thornalley	Thornalley	1:56
14.	"Diving in the Deep End"	Imbruglia; Thornalley	Thornalley	3:54
Total length:				55:53

Left of the Middle – Australian bonus disc
No.	Title	Writer(s)	Producer(s)	Length
1.	"Tomorrow Morning"	Imbruglia; Thornalley	Thornalley	3:00
2.	"Something Better"	Imbruglia; Boo Hewerdine; Thornalley	Thornalley	4:04
3.	"Frightened Child"	Imbruglia; Munday; Thornalley	Thornalley	1:56
4.	"Diving in the Deep End"	Imbruglia; Thornalley	Thornalley	3:54
5.	"City" (Live in Barcelona)	Imbruglia; Thornalley		4:04
Total length:				16:58

Notes

- ^{^a} signifies an additional producer.

== Charts ==
=== Weekly charts ===
Chart (1997–2000)	Peak position
Australian Albums (ARIA)	1
Austrian Albums (Ö3 Austria)	11
Belgian Albums (Ultratop Flanders)	2
Belgian Albums (Ultratop Wallonia)	11
Canadian Albums (Billboard)	9
Danish Albums (Hitlisten)	15
Dutch Albums (Album Top 100)	2
Estonian Albums (Eesti Top 10)	3
European Top 100 Albums (Music & Media)	3
Finnish Albums (Suomen virallinen lista)	8
French Albums (SNEP)	14
German Albums (Offizielle Top 100)	4
Hungarian Albums (MAHASZ)	11
Irish Albums (IRMA)	12
Italian Albums (FIMI)	2
New Zealand Albums (RMNZ)	10
Norwegian Albums (VG-lista)	38
Scottish Albums (Official Charts)	7
Spanish Albums (PROMUSICAE)	11
Swedish Albums (Sverigetopplistan)	2
Swiss Albums (Schweizer Hitparade)	3
UK Albums (Official Charts)	5
US Billboard 200	10

=== Year-end charts ===
Chart (1997)	Position
UK Albums (OCC)	41

Chart (1998)	Position
Australian Albums (ARIA)	5
Belgian Albums (Ultratop Flanders)	12
Belgian Albums (Ultratop Wallonia)	36
Canada Top Albums/CDs (RPM)	27
Dutch Albums (Album Top 100)	25
French Albums (SNEP)	40
German Albums (Offizielle Top 100)	22
New Zealand Albums (RMNZ)	46
Swiss Albums (Schweizer Hitparade)	24
UK Albums (OCC)	19
US Billboard 200	39

Chart (1999)	Position
Australian Albums (ARIA)	68

== Certifications ==
Region	Certification	Certified units/sales
Australia (ARIA)	4× Platinum	280,000^{^}
Belgium (BRMA)	Platinum	50,000^{*}
Canada (Music Canada)	3× Platinum	300,000^{^}
France (SNEP)	Gold	100,000^{*}
Japan (RIAJ)	Platinum	200,000^{^}
Mexico (AMPROFON)	Gold	100,000^{^}
Netherlands (NVPI)	Gold	50,000^{^}
New Zealand (RMNZ)	Platinum	15,000^{^}
Spain (Promusicae)	Platinum	100,000^{^}
Sweden (GLF)	Gold	40,000^{^}
Switzerland (IFPI Switzerland)	Platinum	50,000^{^}
United Kingdom (BPI)	3× Platinum	1,200,000
United States (RIAA)	2× Platinum	2,000,000^{^}
Summaries
Europe (IFPI)	2× Platinum	2,000,000^{*}
^{*} Sales figures based on certification alone.^{^} Shipments figures based on certification alone.
