= Smoke (Natalie Imbruglia song) =

1998 single by Natalie Imbruglia

Single by Natalie Imbruglia

from the album Left of the Middle
- B-side: "City" (live)
- Released: 5 October 1998
- Length: 4:32 (album version); 3:59 (radio edit)
- Label: RCA; BMG
- Songwriters: Natalie Imbruglia; Matt Bronleewe
- Producer: Matt Bronleewe

Natalie Imbruglia singles chronology
"Wishing I Was There" (1998)	"Smoke" (1998)	"Identify" (1999)

Music video
- "Smoke" on YouTube

"Smoke" is a song by Australian singer-songwriter Natalie Imbruglia. It was released on 5 October 1998 as the fourth and final single from her debut album Left of the Middle. The single reached No. 5 on the UK Singles Chart, No. 13 on the Icelandic Singles Chart, and No. 42 on the Australian Singles Chart. The video for "Smoke" was directed by Matthew Rolston. There are two versions of the video; one of which contains additional visual effects including Imbruglia's face appearing and disappearing within animated smoke.

== Track listings ==
Australian CD single

1. "Smoke" – 4:39
2. "Smoke" (Martyn Phillips mix) – 4:10
3. "Smoke" (Ganja Kru mix 1) – 5:12
4. "Smoke" (Way Out West mix 1) – 4:54
5. "Smoke" (Beloved Hypoxic mix) – 5:00
6. "City" (live version)

UK CD1

1. "Smoke" – 4:39
2. "Smoke" (Martyn Phillips & Marc Fox mix) – 4:10
3. "City" (live in Barcelona) – 5:14
4. "Smoke" (video)

UK CD2

1. "Smoke" – 4:39
2. "Smoke" (Ganja Kru mix 1) – 5:12
3. "Smoke" (Way Out West mix 1) – 4:54
4. "Smoke" (Beloved Hypoxic mix) – 5:00

UK cassette single

1. "Smoke" – 4:39
2. "Smoke" (Martyn Phillips & Mark Fox mix) – 4:10

European CD single

1. "Smoke" – 4:39
2. "Smoke" (Martyn Phillips mix) – 4:10

== Charts ==
Chart (1998)	Peak position
Australia (ARIA)	42
Canada Adult Contemporary (RPM)	38
Europe (Eurochart Hot 100)	30
Iceland (Íslenski Listinn Topp 40)	13
Scottish Singles Sales (Official Charts)	6
UK Singles (Official Charts)	5

== Release history ==
Region	Date	Format(s)	Label(s)	Ref.
Sweden	5 October 1998	CD	RCA; BMG	
United Kingdom	5 October 1998	CD; cassette	RCA; BMG	
United States	24 November 1998	Contemporary hit radio	RCA	
