= Shiver (Natalie Imbruglia song) =

2005 single by Natalie Imbruglia

Single by Natalie Imbruglia

from the album Counting Down the Days
- B-side: "When You're Sleeping"; "Pineapple Head"; "My Own Movie"
- Released: 21 March 2005
- Studio: Olympic (London, England); Compton Way; Jacobs (Farnham, Surrey); AM (Valencia, Spain)
- Genre: Pop
- Length: 3:42
- Label: Brightside
- Songwriters: Natalie Imbruglia; Francis White; Shep Solomon
- Producer: Stephen Lipson

Natalie Imbruglia singles chronology
"Beauty on the Fire" (2002)	"Shiver" (2005)	"Counting Down the Days" (2005)

Music video
- "Shiver" on YouTube

"Shiver" is a song by Australian singer Natalie Imbruglia from her third studio album, Counting Down the Days (2005), released as the album's lead single on 21 March 2005. "Shiver" was written by Imbruglia, Francis White and Shep Solomon, whilst production was handled by Stephen Lipson. The song reached No. 19 in her native Australia and at No. 8 on the UK Singles Chart. It also peaked at No. 1 in Hungary and No. 6 in Italy.

== Chart performance ==
"Shiver" reached No. 8 on the UK Singles Chart. Shiver was officially Britain's most broadcast track in 2005, indicating most played on radio, MTV and commercial use. In Europe, "Shiver" was the sixth-most-played song of 2005, accumulating 2,733,820 audience points and 31,423 plays during the year. Shiver became Natalie Imbruglia's biggest pan-European airplay track since "Torn" and as a result is considered her second-biggest hit. The song was covered by Maxïmo Park on BBC Radio 1's Live Lounge. Lara Krost performed the song during Season 5 of Australian Idol. In 2006, Shiver was nominated in the APRA (Australasian Performing Right Association) category for 'Most Performed Foreign Work'. It was also nominated for an Ivor Novello Award for 'Most Performed Track'. As of 2011, "Shiver" had sold approximately 500,000 copies worldwide.

== Music video ==
A music video for "Shiver" was directed by Jake Nava and filmed in Kyiv, Ukraine, in late-2004. It was inspired by the movie The Bourne Supremacy. The video began airing around February 2005.

The video begins with Imbruglia in a field burning some items including her passport and personal effects. She then breaks into a house next to the field, takes a set of car keys and steals a Citroën CX. When she drives away, she is followed by men driving a driving a GAZ Volga 3110 and a BMW 5 Series (E34) who appear to be her enemies. Imbruglia is then shown driving incredibly fast down a street. One of the men chasing her crashes into a car. Her other pursuer suddenly blocks her way, she then reverses back down the street, turns the car around and drives away; Imbruglia is unusually calm despite these circumstances, implying that this is a typical occurrence. She drives down a staircase and crashes next to a train station. She abandons the car and runs into the train station. When the pursuers lose sight of her, she goes into a locker room, oprns a locker to leave a CD in a case, presumably containing data she is selling. She takes cash and a bag containing clothing from the locker which she uses to alter her appearance and also a fake passport, in order to take a train to another city. On the train she is very watchful of the other passengers. After leaving the train, she bumps into a woman on the platform, spilling some of the latter's possessions from her handbag, bending to help her pick them up, recognising her as her contact and discreetly passing her tge locker key. Finally she arrives home. She enters her flat and locks the door, she then sits down at a table and appears to reflect on the day's events. The video ends with Imbruglia's telephone ringing, but she doesn't answer it. It is concluded that she remains a fugitive on the run.

== Track listings ==
Australian CD single and UK CD2

1. "Shiver" (Natalie Imbruglia, Francis White, Shep Solomon) – 3:42
2. "When You're Sleeping" (Imbruglia, Gary Clark) – 3:04
3. "Pineapple Head" (Neil Finn) – 3:21
4. "Shiver" (video) – 3:20

UK CD1 and European CD single

1. "Shiver" (Imbruglia, White, Solomon) – 3:42
2. "My Own Movie" (Imbruglia, Martin Harrington, Ash Howes) – 4:05

European maxi-CD single

1. "Shiver" (Imbruglia, Solomon, White) – 3:42
2. "When You're Sleeping" (Imbruglia, Clark) – 3:04
3. "Pineapple Head" (Finn) – 3:21
4. "Shiver" (edit) (Imbruglia, White, Solomon) – 3:20
5. "Shiver" (video)

== Credits and personnel ==
Credits are lifted from the Counting Down the Days album booklet.

Studios

- Recorded and mixed at Olympic Studios (London, England), Compton Way Studios, Jacobs Studios (Farnham, Surrey), and AM Studio (Valencia, Spain)
- Engineered at The Aquarium (London, England)

Personnel

- Natalie Imbruglia – writing
- Eg White – writing (as Francis White), guitar, keyboards
- Shep Solomon – writing
- Stephen Lipson – guitars, mandolin, keyboards, programming, production
- Peredur ap Gwynedd – guitars
- Rick Willson – guitars
- Rej Rheinallt ap Gwynedd – bass
- Chuck Sabo – drums
- Ash Howes – co-production, mixing
- Martin Harrington – co-production
- Heff Moraes – engineering
- Keith Uddin – additional engineering

== Charts ==
=== Weekly charts ===
Chart (2005)	Peak position
Australia (ARIA)	19
Austria (Ö3 Austria Top 40)	41
Belgium (Ultratop 50 Flanders)	30
Belgium (Ultratop 50 Wallonia)	28
CIS Airplay (TopHit)	61
France (SNEP)	34
Germany (GfK)	52
Greece (IFPI)	32
Hungary (Rádiós Top 40)	1
Ireland (IRMA)	19
Italy (FIMI)	6
Netherlands (Dutch Top 40 Tipparade)	16
Netherlands (Single Top 100)	64
Russia Airplay (TopHit)	63
Scottish Singles Sales (Official Charts)	8
Switzerland (Schweizer Hitparade)	36
Ukraine Airplay (TopHit)	28
UK Singles (Official Charts)	8

=== Year-end charts ===
Chart (2005)	Position
Hungary (Rádiós Top 40)	28
Italy (FIMI)	34
UK Singles (OCC)	79
Ukraine Airplay (TopHit)	94

== Release history ==
Region	Date	Format(s)	Label(s)	Ref.
Australia	21 March 2005	CD	Brightside	
United Kingdom	21 March 2005	CD	Brightside	
