= Natalie Imbruglia =

Australian singer-songwriter and actress (born 1975)

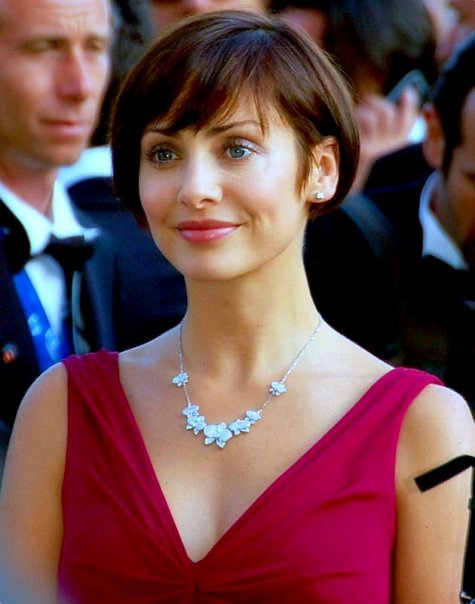
- Imbruglia in 2008
- Born: Natalie Jane Imbruglia; 4 February 1975 (age 51); Sydney, New South Wales, Australia
- Citizenship: Australia; United Kingdom
- Occupations: Singer; songwriter; actress; model
- Years active: 1991–present
- Spouse: Daniel Johns (m. 2003; div. 2008)
- Children: 1
- Relatives: Laura Imbruglia (sister)
- Musical career
- Genres: Pop; pop rock
- Instruments: Vocals
- Labels: RCA; BMG (1997–2004); Brightside/Sony BMG (2005–2007); Malabar Records/Island (2009); Portrait/Sony Music (2015–2018); BMG (2019–present)
- Website: instagram.com/natalie_imbruglia

Natalie Jane Imbruglia (/ɪmˈbruːliə/ im-BROO-lee-ə; born 4 February 1975) is an Australian and British singer, songwriter, and actress.

Born and raised in New South Wales, Imbruglia became widely known in the early 1990s playing Beth Brennan in the soap opera Neighbours. After leaving the series, she moved to the UK to begin a recording career. Her 1997 debut single, a cover of Ednaswap's song "Torn", quickly became a worldwide hit, topped the US Billboard Radio Songs Chart for eleven weeks in 1998, and was listed on the 50 Best Songs of the 1990s by Rolling Stone. Her debut album, Left of the Middle (1997), was a commercial success—earning multi-platinum certifications in the US, the UK and Australia, and selling seven million copies worldwide. Subsequent albums, including White Lilies Island (2001) and Counting Down the Days (2005), were both met with commercial declines, but received gold certifications by the British Phonographic Industry (BPI). As of 2021, Imbruglia has released six studio albums and sold over ten million album equivalent units worldwide. Imbruglia has received various accolades, including eight ARIA Awards, two Brit Awards, one Billboard Music Award, one Silver Clef Award and three Grammy Award nominations.

Imbruglia has appeared in several films, including Johnny English (2003) and Australian indie film Closed for Winter (2009). She has modelled for several brands, such as L'Oreal, Gap, and Kailis. Among other philanthropic work, Imbruglia served as a longtime spokesperson for Virgin Unite and campaigns to raise awareness of obstetric fistula.

== Life and career ==
=== 1975–1994: Early life and career beginnings ===
Imbruglia was born on February 4, 1975, in Sydney, the second of four daughters of Maxene (née Anderson) and Elliot Imbruglia. Her father is of Italian descent, a Sicilian from Lipari who immigrated to Australia with his family at the age of five, and her mother is of Irish, Scottish and English descent, with an ancestor who arrived in Australia as a convict in the First Fleet. Imbruglia grew up in Wyong,New South Wales, and attended Mater Dei College. At 15, she moved to Sydney with her family and studied ballet, tap and Highland dancing. She completed her schooling at McDonald College.

Imbruglia appeared in Australian television commercials for Coca-Cola and the Australian snack Twisties. She left school at the age of 16, to pursue acting. She secured a role as Beth Brennan on the Australian soap opera Neighbours where she shared a house with Benjamin Mitchell who played the parts of Brad Willis and Cameron Hudson. By the end of her second year, she left the show to move to London in 1994. She met Anne Barret, who became her manager and convinced her to record a demo of four songs. She signed a record deal with BMG, after a demo of "Torn" impressed RCA Records.

=== 1997–2000: Left of the Middle and international breakthrough ===
Imbruglia's first international single, "Torn", was a cover of a song of which the first English version was by Ednaswap, an American 1990s rock band, but it was earlier a Danish song released by Lis Sørensen. The song was released on October 27, 1997, in the United Kingdom, and peaked at number two for three weeks on the UK Singles Chart. "Torn" eventually sold over one million copies in the UK alone and became one of the bestselling singles of the 1990s in the UK. Following the success in the UK, the song was getting heavy airplay around the world since late 1997 but not in North America. "Torn" finally made its debut in the United States in January 1998 when a radio station, Los Angeles KROQ, which sensed the buzz and popularity of the song in international markets, started playing an import version of the song, which was quickly followed by other stations. MTV followed by playing its music video, and Saturday Night Live booked Imbruglia for a live performance even before her album was available.

"Torn" debuted at the Top 40 on Billboard Radio Songs Chart on 14 February 1998 and finally reached number one spot on 16 May 1998 and stayed at the summit for eleven consecutive weeks. To promote the album sales in the US, the record label decided not to release the physical single of the song, thus the song did not appear on the Billboard Hot 100 Chart during its popularity peak in mid-1998. The rule was changed due to the public and industry outcry in late-1998, and the song made its appearance on the chart for two weeks, and peaked at number 42. In other markets, "Torn" was a number one song in Canada, Denmark, and number two in her home country, Australia.

Imbruglia performed "Torn" to promote the album and made several appearances on TV shows, including The Rosie O'Donnell Show, Saturday Night Live, The Tonight Show with Jay Leno, and MTV Movie Awards in the United States, The Prince's Trust Party in the Park and Later... with Jools Holland in the United Kingdom, as well as Hey Hey It's Saturday in Australia.

Imbruglia's debut album, Left of the Middle, was released on 24 November 1997. It sold 350,000 in the UK three weeks after release and was certified platinum. It has sold 7 million copies. The second single in the UK after "Torn" was "Big Mistake", which debuted at No. 2. "Wishing I Was There" was less successful, peaking at No. 19. "Wishing I Was There" only peaked at No. 2 on UK radio in summer 1998, and in the US peaked at No. 14 on the Top 40 Show. The final single from Left of the Middle was "Smoke", which had a more divided reception. It was a hit in the UK and made the top five, while in Australia it missed the top 40. Eventually, the album became a million-seller after charting well in many countries and entering the Top 10 in the US and UK. In 1999, she recorded a cover of "Never Tear Us Apart" by INXS with Tom Jones, which appeared on his album Reload.

The "Torn" single and Left of the Middle album earned Imbruglia an MTV Video Music Award for Best New Artist, MTV Europe Music Award for Best Song, six trophies at 12th ARIA Music Award in 1998, including Best New Talent, Best Australian Debut Album, Best Female Artist, and Single of the Year, and two more trophies at 13th ARIA Music Award in 1999, including the Outstanding Achievement Award, as well as two Brit Awards for Best International Newcomer and Best International Female.

=== 2001–2004: White Lilies Island ===
Imbruglia's next album, White Lilies Island, in 2001, was named after where she lived beside the River Thames at Windsor. Imbruglia co-wrote every track over three years. The album's first single, "That Day", was stylistically different from her singles but did not reach the UK Top 10. In the US, "Wrong Impression" was the first single and charted in the Hot 100 Singles and adult contemporary charts. In the UK it did slightly better than That Day. "Beauty on the Fire", the final single, barely entered charts worldwide, and did not make the top 50 in Australia. The album, briefly notorious in the Sony BMG copy protection rootkit scandal, sold 1 million but did not repeat the success of Left of the Middle.

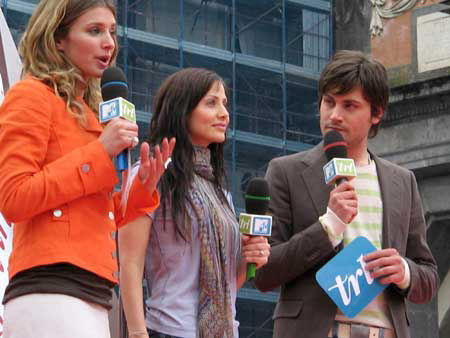
Imbruglia (centre) in Naples, Italy, in 2005

Imbruglia's third album was ready by November 2003; however her record label refused to release it. She was given songs to record with Swedish pop producers, Bloodshy & Avant. She and the record label separated at the beginning of 2004. Four months later she signed with Brightside Recordings, formed by a former Innocent Records executive, Hugh Goldsmith. In 2003, she appeared in the spy parody film Johnny English, playing Rowan Atkinson's love interest, Lorna Campbell, in a Bond girl–style role.

=== 2005–2008: Counting Down the Days ===
In April 2005, Imbruglia's third album Counting Down the Days had "Shiver" as its first single. "Shiver" became her longest-charting single in the UK since "Torn." It topped UK airplay charts for several weeks, reaching eighth in the UK. It became the most-played song of 2005. Counting Down The Days became her first album to reach the top spot on the album charts.

"Sanctuary" was the second single from the album and singles sent to radio stations. The decision was later changed to the title track "Counting Down the Days", with stations asked to play the album version, because the radio mix was not finished. The single on 25 July did not have as much success in the singles chart as "Shiver," although it reignited interest in its album and received airplay in the UK. Due to the single, the album re-entered the top 40 in the UK charts.

Imbruglia made a small European tour, her first since Left of the Middle, in late October and November. Though the album never entered UK Top 40 again, several concerts sold out, notably London.

The album was the 100th-best-selling album in 2005, selling 204,877 copies in the UK alone.

Imbruglia started on her fourth album in late 2005. In mid-2007, plans changed and her record company released a compilation of Imbruglia's 10 years in music. The only single from the album—"Glorious"—premiered in BBC Radio 1 on The Chris Moyles Show. The Singles Collection debuted at No. 5 in the UK, including the single "Glorious" as well as a DVD of Imbruglia's videos. The album sold 600,000 copies.

=== 2009–2014: Come to Life, musical hiatus and stage debut ===
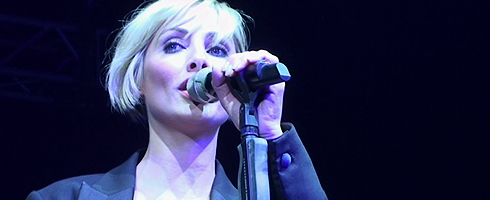
Imbruglia in Bucharest, Romania, in 2008

In late-2008, in the second year of work on her eventual 2009 album Come to Life, Imbruglia parted with her label, Brightside/Sony BMG. She obtained the rights to songs recorded for the album and planned to record on her own label, Malabar Records. Songs were co-written with Ben Hillier, Dave McCracken, her then-husband Daniel Johns, Gary Clark, Jamie Hartman, Paul Harris, Shep Solomon and Chris Martin of Coldplay. Some tracks were produced by Hillier and mixed by Danton Supple.

Accompanied by an extensive television advertising campaign and press campaign, Come to Life was released, through Island Records, on 2 October 2009 in Australia. It entered the Australian albums chart at No. 67 on 19 October 2009, making it Imbruglia's worst performing album to date, selling just 750 copies in its first week of release and spending only two weeks in the Top 100. It had been announced that the album would be released in the United Kingdom on 3 May 2010, preceded by the track "Scars" to be released as a single on 22 March 2010. Following the disappointing reaction on the Australian charts, the official UK launch of the album, and the single, was delayed, then cancelled. All plans to launch the album in the United States were also cancelled, with the album eventually made available online through Amazon Music.

After the failure of Come to Life, Imbruglia took a six-year hiatus from music, shifting her focus back to acting. Imbruglia moved to Los Angeles and hired acting coach Ivana Chubbuck. She appeared in three movies over the next five years, Closed for Winter (2009), Underdogs (2013) and Among Ravens (2014).

In April 2014, Imbruglia made her stage debut in a UK production of Things We Do For Love, at the Theatre Royal, Bath.

=== 2014–2018: Male ===
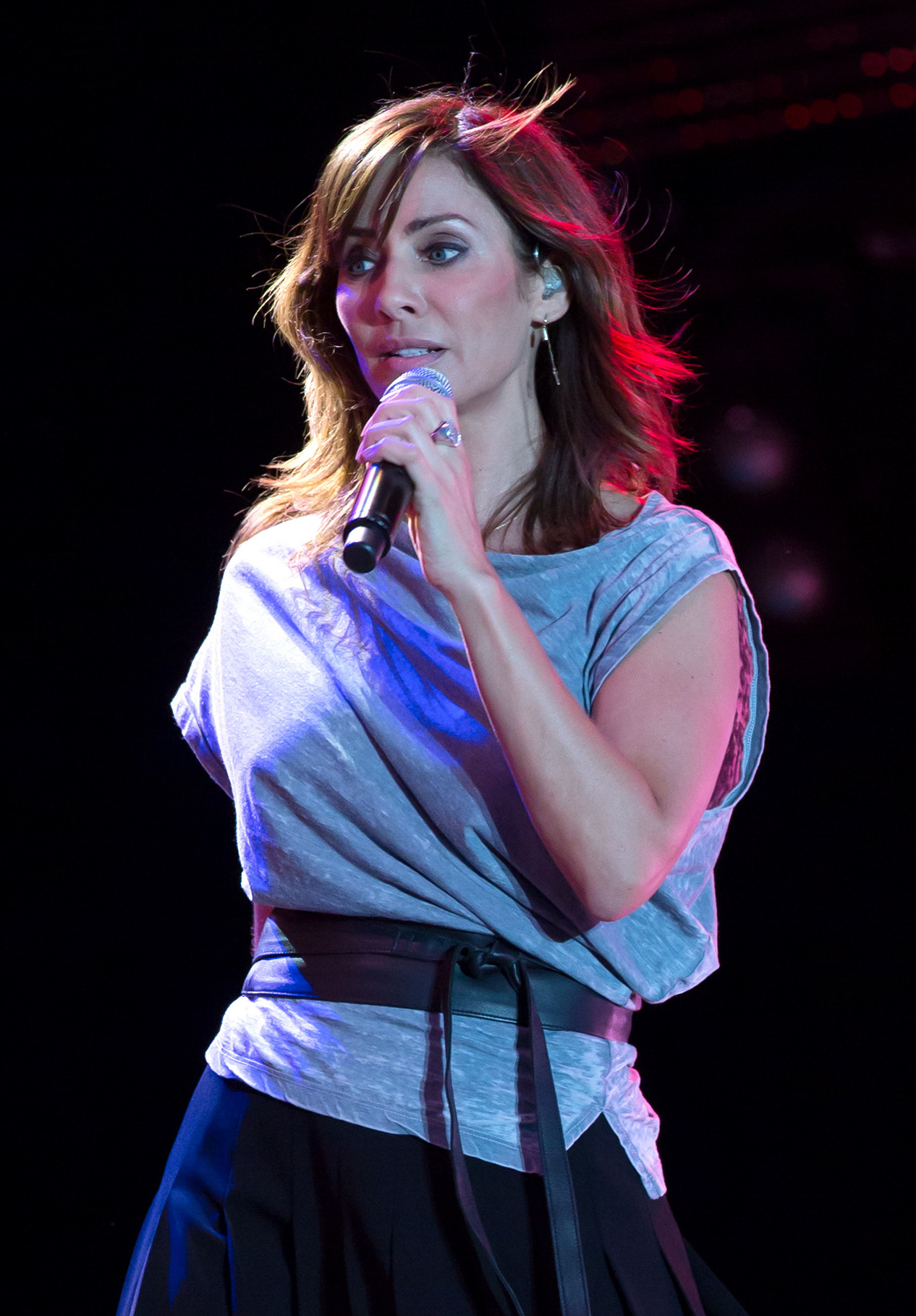
Imbruglia performing in 2015

On 3 December 2014, Imbruglia signed with Sony Masterworks and planned to make her first album in five years, covering famous songs by a range of male artists. The first single is a cover of "Instant Crush", originally by Daft Punk featuring Julian Casablancas. Male was released on 31 July 2015, her fifth studio album. During the spring of 2017, Imbruglia took her Acoustic Tour to Europe in support of the album. In 2018 she continued with a tour around the UK.

=== 2018–2025: Firebird and Neighbours finale ===
In an Instagram post in November 2018, Imbruglia stated that new music was due in 2019. In February 2019 it was announced that Albert Hammond Jr. of the Strokes was in the studio with Imbruglia working on new music, along with Strokes producer Gus Oberg.

Imbruglia signed to BMG in July 2019, her original record label from 1997 to 2007, with plans to release an album of new material sometime in 2020. This was subsequently pushed back to 2021.

On 18 June 2021, Imbruglia released "Build It Better", the first single from her sixth studio album Firebird, which was released on 24 September 2021. The official video for "Build It Better" was directed by Amy Becker-Burnett, with choreography by Gregory Haney and Alex Sarmiento. "Build It Better" did not enter the Official UK Top 100 Chart, but peaked at No. 67 on the Official Singles Sales Chart Top 100 and at number 66 on the Official Singles Download Chart Top 100.

In 2022, Imbruglia won the third series of the British version of The Masked Singer as "Panda". Imbruglia released her version of "Story of My Life" (a song she performed on the show) on 12 February 2022. It debuted on the UK Official Singles Sales Chart Top 100 at number 49. The Firebird album re-entered the UK Official Album Downloads chart at number 32.

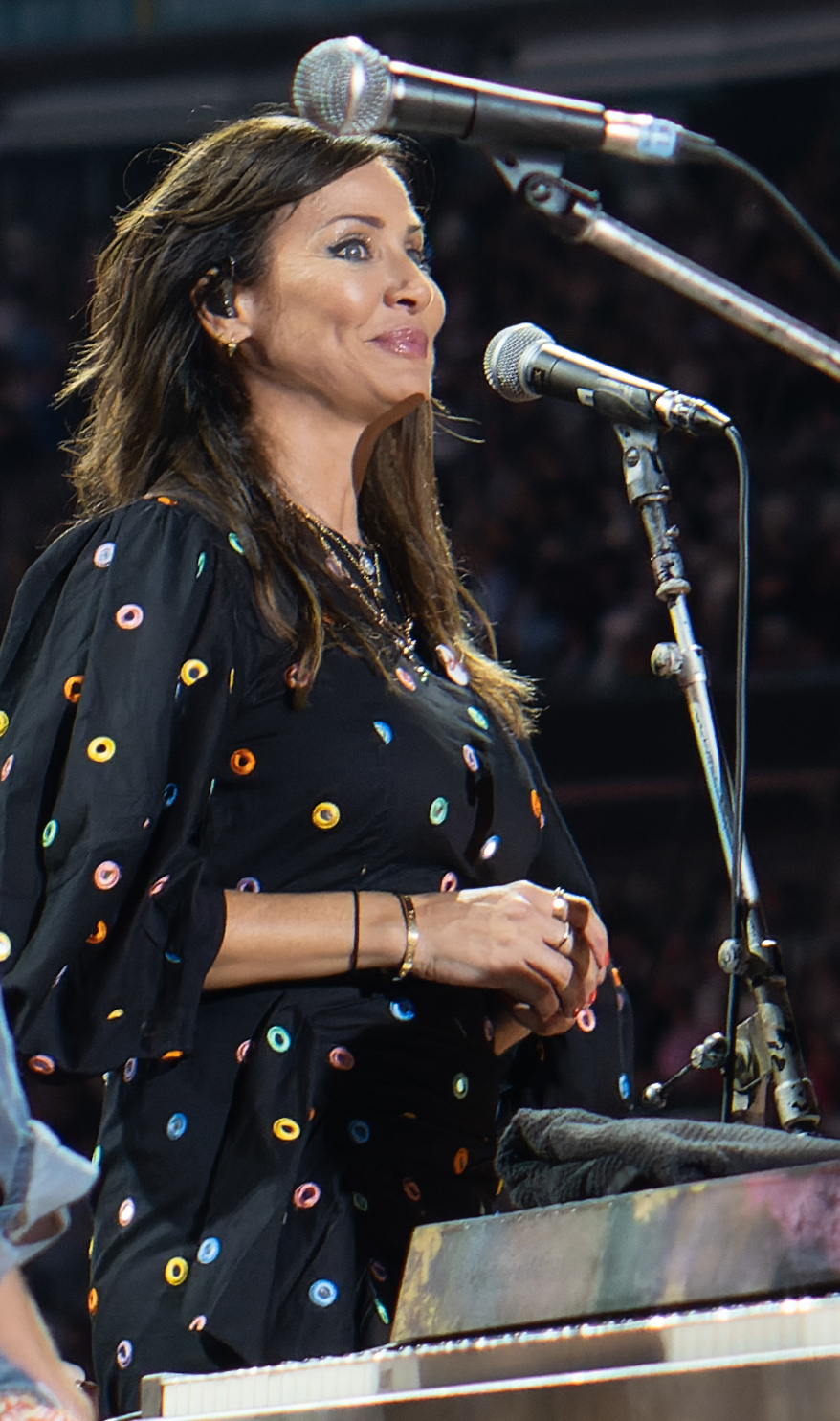
Imbruglia with Coldplay at Wembley Stadium in 2022

On 28 July 2022, Imbruglia made a cameo appearance as Beth in the final-ever Neighbours episode. Her appearance was filmed alongside Holly Valance's character, Felicity Scully.

In February 2024, it was announced that Imbruglia would embark on a UK and Ireland tour with the Irish group the Corrs. Also in 2024, Imbruglia competed in season twelve of The Masked Singer as "Bluebell" where Kelly Osbourne (who competed as "Ladybug" in season two) served as her Mask Ambassador. She was eliminated in the Group B Finals.

=== 2026–present: Algorithm ===
In April 2026, Imbruglia released "Upside Down" as the lead single to her album Algorithm, based in part on her addictive relationship with her mobile phone, which she has described as late night "doomscrolling" in a 2026 podcast interview with Davina McCall.

== Other activities ==
In May 2010, Imbruglia became a judge replacing Kate Ceberano on the second season of the Australian version of The X Factor. She mentored the Girls category, in which her final act Sally Chatfield was the runner up of the series. In 2011, she did not return for the third season and was replaced by Natalie Bassingthwaighte.

In June 2010, Imbruglia appeared on the original British version of the show, where she was a guest judge for the Birmingham auditions on its seventh series.

In 2016 Imbruglia was cast in the second season of SBS TV series First Contact.

In 2024, she released an Audible Original podcast, Sleep Sound with Natalie Imbruglia. In the podcast she recites poetry by the late Australian poet, Dorothea Mackellar.

== Personal life ==
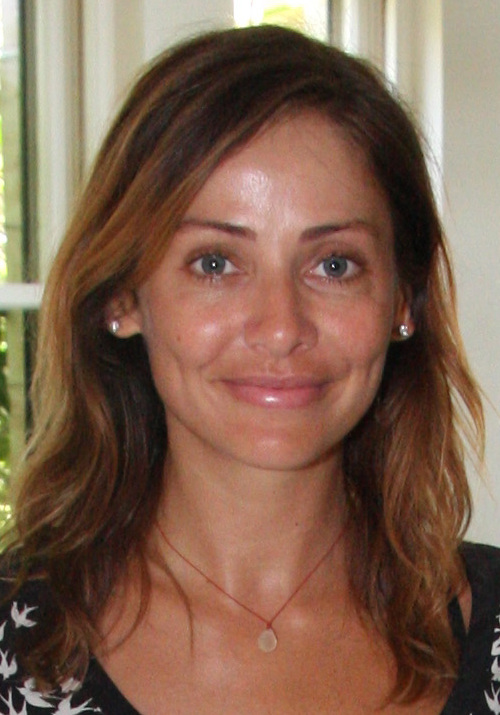
Imbruglia in 2011

=== Relationships and citizenship ===
Natalie Imbruglia is the elder sister of singer-songwriter Laura Imbruglia. During her time on Neighbours she briefly dated her co-star Stefan Dennis. Imbruglia dated American actor David Schwimmer in the late 1990s. Sir Liam Fox claimed he suggested "Torn" as a single. He was friends with Imbruglia's manager.

In 1999, Imbruglia met Silverchair frontman Daniel Johns backstage at his band's concert in London. They started dating after meeting again at the ARIA awards after-party at the Gazebo Hotel in Sydney in October of the same year. After years of an on-and-off relationship, they announced their engagement shortly before Christmas 2002 and they married on New Year's Eve 2003 in a beach ceremony in Port Douglas, Queensland. Imbruglia stated in a 2002 interview that meeting Johns saved her from depression. Johns wrote the song "Satisfied" for Imbruglia's 2005 album Counting Down the Days, which he also produced and co-wrote the song "Want" from Imbruglia's 2009 album Come to Life. Imbruglia wrote her 2005 single "Counting Down the Days" about their long-distance relationship, as Imbruglia was based in London and Johns lived in Newcastle, Australia. They announced their divorce on 4 January 2008, stating, "We have simply grown apart through not being able to spend enough time together."

Imbruglia became a naturalised British citizen in 2013.

On 9 October 2019, Imbruglia announced on Instagram that she had given birth to a baby boy. The child was conceived using IVF and sperm from an unnamed donor, as of 2026, Imbruglia has said that she is single and her priority is focused on her son.

=== Philanthropy ===
Imbruglia is an ambassador for Virgin Unite, supporting campaigns to end poverty and to bring attention to obstetric fistula.

She appeared in a sketch at the Secret Policeman's Ball for Amnesty International on 31 October 2006. Imbruglia has also spoken of clinical depression to raise awareness about the disorder.

In 2008, she supported the Fashion Targets Breast Cancer campaign in support of Breakthrough Breast Cancer, alongside comedian Alan Carr, presenter Edith Bowman, actress Anna Friel, and model Twiggy.

=== Mental health ===
Imbruglia has been diagnosed with attention deficit hyperactivity disorder and obsessive-compulsive disorder: “You name it, there’s a sprinkle of it. They’re just labels. It’s not a negative, it’s my superpower."

== Awards and nominations ==
Award	Year	Nominee(s)	Category	Result	Ref.
APRA Music Awards	1999	"Big Mistake"	Most Performed Foreign Work	Nominated	
APRA Music Awards	2006	"Shiver"	Most Performed Foreign Work	Nominated	
ARIA Music Awards	1998	Left of the Middle	Album of the Year	Nominated	
ARIA Music Awards	1998	Left of the Middle	Best Female Artist	Won	
ARIA Music Awards	1998	Left of the Middle	Best New Talent	Won	
ARIA Music Awards	1998	Left of the Middle	Breakthrough Artist – Album	Won	
ARIA Music Awards	1998	Left of the Middle	Best Pop Release	Won	
ARIA Music Awards	1998	"Torn"	Single of the Year	Won	
ARIA Music Awards	1998	"Torn"	Breakthrough Artist – Single	Won	
ARIA Music Awards	1998	"Torn"	Highest Selling Single	Nominated	
ARIA Music Awards	1998	"Big Mistake"	Highest Selling Single	Nominated	
ARIA Music Awards	1999	Left of the Middle	Highest Selling Album	Nominated	
ARIA Music Awards	1999	Herself	Outstanding Achievement	Won	
ARIA Music Awards	1999	"Wishing I Was There"	Best Female Artist	Won	
ARIA Music Awards	2002	White Lilies Island	Best Female Artist	Nominated	
ARIA Music Awards	2005	Counting Down the Days	Best Female Artist	Nominated	
American Music Awards	1999	Herself	Favorite Pop/Rock New Artist	Nominated	
Billboard Music Awards	1998	"Torn"	Top Hot 100 Airplay Track	Nominated	
Billboard Music Awards	1998	"Torn"	Top Adult Top 40 Track	Won	
Billboard Music Awards	1998	Herself	Top Adult Top 40 Artist	Nominated	
Grammy Awards	1999	Herself	Best New Artist	Nominated	
Grammy Awards	1999	Left of the Middle	Best Pop Vocal Album	Nominated	
Grammy Awards	1999	"Torn"	Best Female Pop Vocal Performance	Nominated	
MTV Europe Music Awards	1998	Herself	Best New Act	Nominated	
MTV Europe Music Awards	1998	Herself	Best Female	Nominated	
MTV Europe Music Awards	1998	"Torn"	Best Song	Won	
Mo Awards	1998	Natalie Imbruglia	Rock Performer of the Year	Won	
Mo Awards	1998	Natalie Imbruglia	Australian Showbusiness Ambassador	Won	
MTV Video Music Award	1998	"Torn"	Best New Artist	Won	
MTV Video Music Award	1998	"Torn"	Best Female Video	Nominated	
MTV Video Music Award	1998	"Torn"	Viewer's Choice	Nominated	
NME Awards	1998	Herself	Best New Band	Nominated	
NME Awards	1998	Herself	Best Solo Artist	Nominated	
NME Awards	1999	Herself	Most Desirable Person	Won	
NME Awards	1999	Herself	Top Pop Personality You'd Most Like as Your Doctor	Won	
Žebřík Music Awards	1997	Herself	Best International Female	Nominated	
Žebřík Music Awards	1998	Herself	Best International Female	Nominated	
Žebřík Music Awards	2005	Herself	Best International Female	Nominated	

Year	Award	Category	Country	For	Result
1999	Pollstar Concert Industry Awards	Best New Artist Tour	Europe	Herself	Nominated
1999	ECHO Awards	Best International Newcomer	Germany	Herself	Nominated
1999	ECHO Awards	Best International Female	Germany	Herself	Nominated
1999	Brit Awards	International Newcomer	UK	Left of the Middle	Won
1999	Brit Awards	International Female Solo Artist	UK	Left of the Middle	Won
1999	People's Choice Awards	Favorite Rising Star	US	Left of the Middle	Nominated
1999	Premios Amigo Awards	Best International Female	Spain	Left of the Middle	Nominated
1999	Premios Amigo Awards	Best New Artist/Group	Spain	Left of the Middle	Nominated
2000	IFPI	Platinum Award for over 2 Million Sales	World	Left of the Middle	Won
2002	Silver Clef Award	International Award	UK		Won
2005	PPL Awards	Most Performed Track	UK	Shiver	Won
2006	NRJ Music Award	Best International Female	France	Counting Down the Days	Nominated
2006	Ivor Novello Awards	Most Performed Track	UK	Shiver	Nominated
2009	Asian Festival of First Films	Best Actress	Singapore	Closed for Winter	Nominated
2012	InStyle Women of Style	News & Entertainment	Australia	–	Nominated

== Tours ==
=== Headlining ===
- Left of the Middle Tour (1998)
- Counting Down the Days Tour (2005)
- Come to Life Tour (2009)
- Acoustic Tour (2017–2018)
- Left of the Middle 25th Anniversary Tour (2022)

=== Supporting ===
- Simply Red – The Big Love Tour (UK) (2015)
- Simply Red – The Big Love Tour (Australia) (2016)
- The Corrs – Down Under Tour (2023)
- The Corrs – Talk on Corners Tour (2024)
- The Corrs – Summer Sunshine Tour (UK & Ireland) (2025)

== Discography ==
- Left of the Middle (1997)
- White Lilies Island (2001)
- Counting Down the Days (2005)
- Come to Life (2009)
- Male (2015)
- Firebird (2021)
- Algorithm (2026)

== Filmography ==
=== Film ===
Year	Film	Role	Notes
2003	Johnny English	Lorna Campbell	
2009	Closed for Winter	Elise Silverston	
2013	Underdogs	Michelle Stratton	
2014	Among Ravens	Madison	
2015	Little Loopers	Kristen Wright	

=== Television ===
Year	Show	Role	Notes
1992–1994, 2022	Neighbours	Beth Brennan	Main cast, 253 episodes
1997	Law of the Land	Faye Watson	Episode "Late Kill"
1998	Saturday Night Live	Musical Guest/Herself	
2002	Legend of the Lost Tribe	Koala	Voice Actor
2009	In Memory of Maia	Herself	Documentary
2010	The X Factor UK	Guest Judge	
2010	The X Factor Australia	Judge/Herself	
2016	First Contact	Herself	3 episodes
2018	Who Do You Think You Are?	Herself	
2022	The Masked Singer (UK)	Herself/Panda	UK series 3; winner
2024	The Masked Singer	Herself/Bluebell	Season 12 contestant

=== Theatre ===
Year	Show	Role	Notes
2014	Things We Do For Love	Nikki	

Awards and achievements
Preceded by Fiona Apple	MTV Video Music Award for Best New Artist; 1998	Succeeded by Eminem
Preceded by "Mmmbop" by Hanson	MTV Europe Music Award for Best Song for "Torn"; 1998	Succeeded by "...Baby One More Time" by Britney Spears
