= Sony malware =

Sony malware may refer to:

- Sony BMG CD copy protection scandal
- Extended Copy Protection
- MediaMax CD-3
- Macrovision CDS-200

== See also ==
- OtherOS - PS3 Feature promised by Sony
