= Copy Control =

Generic name of a copy prevention system

Copy Control logo

Copy Control was the generic name of a copy prevention system, used from 2001 until 2006 on several digital audio disc releases by EMI Group and Sony BMG Music Entertainment in several regions (Europe, Canada, United States, and Australia). It should not be confused with the CopyControl computer software copy protection system introduced by Microcosm Ltd in 1989.

Several types of protection existed. While basically intended as a means of copy-protecting compact discs, Copy Control discs cannot properly be referred to as CDs because the system introduces incompatible data, making the discs non-compliant with the Red Book standard for audio CDs. The system is intended to prevent digital audio extraction ("ripping") from the protected discs, and thus limit the file sharing of ripped music. The techniques used are:

- Multisession (Blue Book) information is included which effectively hides the audio tracks from most CD-ROM drives;
- Error-correction codes for the audio data are corrupted, which may introduce audible errors to ripped copies.
- The data area of the disc usually includes DRM-restricted copies of the audio content, for which a player only exists on the dominant PC operating system, Microsoft Windows.

In the Netherlands, the record labels Sony and Universal experimented with copy control until 2004. EMI kept using it until June 2006, when they dropped it.

In the United States, Universal Music Group experimented with copy control on a few soundtracks in 2001 and 2002, but abandoned it afterwards; Warner Music Group has only used it in Europe on such releases as Red Hot Chili Peppers' Greatest Hits and Madonna's Music. As of September 2006, Cactus Data Shield, the Macrovision technology behind Copy Control, is no longer listed as a product on Macrovision's website and has completely been abandoned in countries such as Australia.

A December 2006 issue of Billboard magazine announced that EMI had decided to abandon Copy Control worldwide. Until then, it had been unclear whether EMI had completely abandoned it, as there was no press release.

== Background ==
The Copy Control protections were devised in response to the file sharing and casual CD copying that has become commonplace in recent years, allegedly causing the music industry significant losses, or "ungained" revenues. Neither issue was particularly relevant when the CD standard was introduced in the early 1980s, and thus, unlike the more recent DVDs, the CD standard specifies no inherent form of copy protection or other digital rights management. Copy Control is one of a number of attempts to apply copy protection on top of the CD standard, but since it is merely a modification of the already unrestricted standard that must still yield usable results in most CD players, the efficacy of the system varies significantly. Nevertheless, EMI's labelling of some Copy Controlled discs attempted to override consumers' statutory rights with the disclaimer "except for defective product resulting from the manufacturing process, no exchange, return or refund is permitted".

== Circumvention ==
A Copy Control disc will appear as a mixed-mode disc, with audio and data content. Under Windows, inserting the disc will usually autorun an audio player utility, which plays the DRM-protected audio files provided. This can be temporarily disabled by holding down the shift key while inserting the disc on Windows XP and earlier, users of Windows Vista and 7 may simply choose not to run the DRM content.

The ability to extract the CD-Audio tracks is otherwise largely dependent on the disc drive used. The first obstacle is the "fake" Table of Contents (ToC), which is intended to mask the audio tracks from CD-ROM drives. However CD-R/RW drives, and similar, can usually access all session data on a disc, and thus can properly read the audio segment.

The other major obstacle is the incompatible (and technically corrupted) error-correction data. Again, the effect of this is dependent on the disc drive; some drives will be able to read the data without problems, but others will produce audio files with loud pops every few seconds. As a consequence of having faulty error-correction codes, the discs may be less resilient to anything that might cause a read error, such as dust and scratches resulting from normal use.

Copy Control also does not prevent copying a disc by recording it as analog audio through a computer's sound card, which only causes a slight degradation in audio quality. More substantial is the loss in recording speed. This weakness, inherent in all digital copy prevention systems, is known as the "analog hole". As an alternative that does not rely on the "analog hole", it may be possible to copy the content using a digital link while playing it through a sound card that has a digital audio output.

Usually a CD-R/RW drive will play the disc but with occasional stops (about every 10 seconds) and DVD-R/RW drives will be able to read the data without problems and can be ripped straight to the PC. CD-ROM or DVD-ROM drives in a computer will usually refuse to play the data except in the provided player.

Systems other than Windows can just as easily play Copy Control discs, as many players on Windows are proprietary and respect the copy-restrictions. Similarly, the auto-launchers are only written for Windows and will only ambush Windows users (this can be mitigated by disabling autorun). There is little that can be done to stop a user who is not running Windows or who is using non-Microsoft CD ripping software from ripping a Copy Control disc.

In Linux, Copy Control discs are easily accessed through cdparanoia or any other software that uses it, such as the KDE "audiocd:/" service.

In Mac OS X, these discs are easily accessed through iTunes and QuickTime (When a CDDA track is dragged to a folder other than the CD, QuickTime automatically converts it to AIFF, which is a lossless PCM format).

== Content on the CD extra ==
CDS-100 or CDS-200
A player and a media file database (a copy of the audio contents in Windows Media). The player will only play the audio contents in the media file database.
CDS-300
A player and the anti-copy program only. The player can ignore the anti-copy program to read the audio tracks. The player allow users to play the tracks, rip the audio tracks as DRM-enabled WMA files and burn CD for 3 times (The player will rip the CD as 320 kbit/s WMA files, then burn the audio on a CD-R, notice that the volume is lower and the quality is worse on the burned CD).

== See also ==
- Copy protection for audio CDs
- MediaMax CD-3
- Key2Audio
- Extended Copy Protection
- Sony BMG copy protection rootkit scandal
