= Danny Wilson (band) =

Scottish pop group

- Origin: Dundee, Scotland, UK
- Genres: Pop; sophisti-pop
- Years active: 1984–1991; 1993; 2014
- Label: Virgin
- Past members: Gary Clark; Kit Clark; Ged Grimes

Danny Wilson were a Scottish pop band formed in Dundee in 1984. The band was best known for its 1988 UK number 3 hit single "Mary's Prayer".

The band served as a launchpad for the career of Gary Clark, who also played in the 1990s bands King L and Transister before becoming a successful songwriter for other artists including Natalie Imbruglia, Liz Phair, Nick Carter, k.d. lang and former Spice Girls Melanie C and Emma Bunton. Other former members of the band have played in Simple Minds, Deacon Blue and Swiss Family Orbison.

== History ==
=== Background and early history ===
Gary Clark and Ged Grimes grew up together in Dundee in Scotland in the UK, and played together in school bands. Influenced by soul and pop artists such as Steely Dan, Stevie Wonder, Burt Bacharach, and Hal David, they eventually moved to London, where they played in the bands Perfect Strangers and Dream Kitchen during the early 1980s. Neither band met with success: circa 1984, while still in London, Clark and Grimes noticed that talent scouts and journalists were beginning to follow the soul and pop scenes in Scottish cities. Returning to Dundee, they teamed up with Gary Clark's younger brother Kit to form a new band called Spencer Tracy (named after the film star of the same name).

Initially spotted by music journalist Bob Flynn, during a very sparsely attended gig in Edinburgh and after a glowing review piece by Flynn in Melody Maker which attracted much attention from record labels, Spencer Tracy signed to Virgin Records in 1986. After objections from the estate of the actor Spencer Tracy, the band was obliged to change its name. Gary Clark recalls this as "a real last-minute crazy, fearful moment... The album was done, the artwork was done... We were just told, 'If you try and use this, you will be sued.' And so the label just went 'Nope. Change it. Now.'" For their new name, the band chose Danny Wilson, taken from a 1952 Frank Sinatra film called Meet Danny Wilson (itself a favourite film of the Clark brothers' father).

The band remained a trio throughout its lifetime, hiring in other members (drummers in particular). Lead vocals were shared between the Clark brothers: Gary, as the band's main songwriter, took the majority, but over time Kit would sing and write more.

=== Meet Danny Wilson ===
The band's debut album, Meet Danny Wilson, written entirely by Gary Clark, was released in 1987. An acclaimed mix of sophisti-pop with elements of soul, jazz and bossa nova, it included an appearance by Lester Bowie's Brass Fantasy among others.

The lead single, "Mary's Prayer", issued in the spring, was initially unsuccessful in the United Kingdom, missing the official UK Top 75 and peaking at number 86. However its US release that summer afforded Danny Wilson a surprise US Top 40 hit, peaking at number 23 on the Billboard Hot 100. The band toured the United States in the autumn of 1987, supporting Simply Red and proving successful with that group's fans.

The US success of "Mary's Prayer" led to its UK re-release with a resultant number 42 UK chart peak. After it topped a BBC Radio 1 phone-in poll of listeners' nominations for 1987 singles which had undeservedly failed to reach the upper UK chart, Virgin Records UK gave the single a second re-release with a resultant number 3 UK chart peak. Meet Danny Wilson generated two more singles: "Davy" and "A Girl I Used to Know", both of which preceded the successful reissue of "Mary's Prayer" but neither of which matched its success.

=== Bebop Moptop ===
The band released its second album, Bebop Moptop, the following year. Gary Clark was no longer the band's only songwriter, as Ged Grimes and Kit Clark co-wrote "I Can't Wait" and Kit also contributed "N.Y.C. Shanty", both of which Kit sang on the record. The first single released from the album was "Never Gonna Be the Same", but this was overshadowed by its successor, the hit single "The Second Summer of Love", which reached number 23 in the British charts.

Three more singles were released from Bebop Moptop – "If Everything You Said Was True", the slow ballad "If You Really Love Me (Let Me Go)", and "I Can't Wait", but, in spite of Virgin Records' promotional efforts, none of them were hits. Gary Clark has subsequently suggested that this was simply down to airplay problems: "Virgin were really great at that time, and, y'know, we didn't really fit what was on the radio at any time. We kind of got lucky with "Mary's Prayer", in the sense that it just happened to fit, whereas the records were pretty eclectic. And Virgin, even though they loved the band and loved the stuff, they obviously had trouble at radio. It didn't fit with what was going on."

=== Split ===
By the time the band began to demo the third Danny Wilson album in 1991, all three members had written more songs than would fit onto the album, leading to arguments and frustration. Kit Clark attempted to solve the situation by persuading Virgin Records to let him record a solo album, but was rebuffed; following this, he decided to leave the band. Deciding that Danny Wilson would be too much reduced without Kit's contribution ("he was kind of a really good force just in terms of ideas and the flavour of things"), Gary Clark opted to break up the band, maintaining its creative integrity and the friendships between all members before both were spoiled.

A second reason cited for Danny Wilson's dissolution was the three members' collective frustration with the way the band itself overshadowed the people in it. The band name was often mistaken for that of a non-existent frontman, for whom Grimes and the Clark brothers were simply sidemen. Kit Clark once commented "We felt like three men in one grave."

The split was amicable, with all three members supporting – and sometimes playing on – each other's future projects. A compilation album, Sweet Danny Wilson, was released by Virgin Records in 1991 (containing a bonus album of live recordings called Three-In-A-Bed Romp). This was followed in 1995 by a compilation album entitled The Best Of Danny Wilson.

In 2025 the band joined with independent record label Cherry Red Records to release the 5-disc anthology Complete Danny Wilson, a career-encompassing release which included both of the band's studio albums, the b-sides and rare tracks which had featured on Sweet Danny Wilson, and for the first time commercially, the full recording of the band's 1st October 1989 show at the "Town & Country Club" (now known as the O2 Forum Kentish Town).

The songs which Gary Clark had written for the unrecorded third Danny Wilson album ended up on his 1993 solo album Ten Short Songs About Love (on which both Ged Grimes and Kit Clark performed).

=== Post-band activities ===
Following the relative commercial failure of Ten Short Songs About Love, Gary Clark abandoned solo work to form first the rock band King L (with American bass player Eric Pressly and former Bible guitarist Neill Maccoll) and then the pop band Transister (with Pressly and lead singer Keeley Hawkes). Clark then stepped down from performing to turn his attention to writing and producing for other artists. In 2001, he worked on Natalie Imbruglia's second album, White Lilies Island, and co-wrote most of the album's songs with her, including the single "Wrong Impression". He continued to collaborate with her until 2009.

Gary Clark has also worked as a songwriter or producer for Liz Phair, Nick Carter, Ashley Parker Angel, k.d. lang, Ferras, The Wanted, Demi Lovato, Delta Goodrem and Spice Girls Melanie C and Emma Bunton. Following spells living in London, France and Los Angeles, he has recently returned to live in Dundee. In 2016, Clark composed the score for the Irish film Sing Street and either wrote or co-wrote all of the original songs featured in the film.

In 1991, Kit Clark released a solo EP called Lovedung on Reverb Records. He went on to play with his own bands Pony and Swiss Family Orbison during the 1990s and early 2000s. In 2010 he began to perform as a solo artist.

Having spent time as a music writer for computer games, Ged Grimes is currently the bass player for Simple Minds (and has also played with another high-profile Scottish rock band, Deacon Blue).

=== Occasional reunions (1993, 2014) ===
On 30 October 1993, Gary Clark and former Bible frontman Boo Hewerdine (who were friends and songwriting collaborators) played a full-length concert at London's Queen Elizabeth Hall, sharing the stage throughout while alternating songs written by one or the other or by both together. Both Ged Grimes and Kit Clark played in the five-piece concert band, which played a number of Danny Wilson songs. In effect, this was a version of Danny Wilson fronted by both Clark and Hewerdine, although the evening was billed very much as friends playing together rather than a formal reunion.

The Danny Wilson trio would not reunite on stage for another twenty-one years. In mid-2014 (around the time Gary Clark returned to live in Dundee following many years of being based in London or Los Angeles), the band briefly and secretly reformed to play a short set at a friend's wedding in Dundee. Clark announced afterwards that there were no plans to extend the reunion and that it had taken place as a favour.

On 24 September 2014, the band reunited for their first true public performance in twenty-five years, playing "Mary's Prayer" at the opening ceremony of the Ryder Cup at Glasgow Hydro (alongside other performers, including Texas, Amy Macdonald, Twin Atlantic, Eddi Reader and Midge Ure). Emphasizing Kit Clark's solo career and Ged Grimes' ongoing work with Simple Minds, Clark once again stated that the performance was "unlikely to herald a permanent reunion".

== Members ==
Principal members

- Gary Clark – lead vocals, guitars, keyboards, harmonica, etc.
- Kit Clark – guitars, backing and lead vocals, keyboards, harmonica, percussion, etc.
- Ged Grimes – bass guitar, upright bass, keyboards, backing vocals, etc.

== Discography ==
=== Albums ===
Year	Album	Label	Peak chart positions	
Year	Album	Label	US	UK
1987	Meet Danny Wilson	Virgin Records	79	65
1989	Bebop Moptop	Virgin Records	—	24
1991	Sweet Danny Wilson	Virgin Records	—	54
1995	The Best of Danny Wilson	Virgin Records	—	—
2025	Complete Danny Wilson	Cherry Red Records	—	—
"—" denotes releases that did not chart or were not released in that territory.

=== Singles ===
Year	Single	Peak chart positions				
Year	Single	AUS	GER	US Adult	US Pop	UK
1987	"Mary's Prayer"	64	35	6	23	3
1987	"A Girl I Used to Know"	—	—	―	—	81
1987	"Davy"	—	—	—	―	83
1989	"The Second Summer of Love"	151	52	―	—	23
1989	"Never Gonna Be the Same"	—	—	―	—	69
1989	"I Can't Wait"	―	—	―	—	92
1989	"If Everything You Said Was True"	—	—	49	—	―
1991	"If You Really Love Me (Let Me Go)" [EP]	―	—	―	—	―
"—" denotes releases that did not chart or were not released in that territory.
