= Total Defence =

Total Defence may refer to:

== Defence policy ==
- Total defence, the general concept in defence policy.
- Total Defence (Singapore), the defence strategy introduced in Singapore in 1984.
- National CBRN Defence Centre (Totalförsvarets skyddscentrum), also known as the Total Defence Protection Center in Sweden.

== Sports ==
- Total defense (gridiron football), gridiron football statistic, counterpart to total offense

== Software ==
- CA Anti-Spyware, computer software provided by Total Defense Inc.
