= Java class file =

Executable Java file format

- Internet media type: application/java-vm, application/x-httpd-java, application/x-java, application/java, application/java-byte-code, application/x-java-class, application/x-java-vm
- Developed by: Sun Microsystems

A Java class file is a file (with the .class filename extension) containing Java bytecode that can be executed on the Java Virtual Machine (JVM). A Java class file is usually produced by a Java compiler from Java programming language source files (.java files) containing Java classes (alternatively, other JVM languages can also be used to create class files). If a source file has more than one class, each class is compiled into a separate class file. Thus, it is called a .class file because it contains the bytecode for a single class.

JVMs are available for many platforms, and a class file compiled on one platform will execute on a JVM of another platform. This makes Java applications platform-independent.

== History ==
On 11 December 2006, the class file format was modified under Java Specification Request (JSR) 202.

== File layout and structure ==
=== Sections ===
There are 10 basic sections to the Java class file structure:

- Magic Number: 0xCAFEBABE
- Version of Class File Format: the minor and major versions of the class file
- Constant Pool: Pool of constants for the class
- Access Flags: for example whether the class is abstract, static, etc.
- This Class: The name of the current class
- Super Class: The name of the super class
- Interfaces: Any interfaces in the class
- Fields: Any fields in the class
- Methods: Any methods in the class
- Attributes: Any attributes of the class (for example the name of the sourcefile, etc.)

=== Magic Number ===
Class files are identified by the following 4 byte header (in hexadecimal): CA FE BA BE (the first 4 entries in the table below). The history of this magic number was explained by James Gosling referring to a restaurant in Palo Alto:

"We used to go to lunch at a place called St Michael's Alley. According to local legend, in the deep dark past, the Grateful Dead used to perform there before they made it big. It was a pretty funky place that was definitely a Grateful Dead Kinda Place. When Jerry died, they even put up a little Buddhist-esque shrine. When we used to go there, we referred to the place as Cafe Dead. Somewhere along the line it was noticed that this was a HEX number. I was re-vamping some file format code and needed a couple of magic numbers: one for the persistent object file, and one for classes. I used CAFEDEAD for the object file format, and in grepping for 4 character hex words that fit after "CAFE" (it seemed to be a good theme) I hit on BABE and decided to use it. At that time, it didn't seem terribly important or destined to go anywhere but the trash-can of history. So CAFEBABE became the class file format, and CAFEDEAD was the persistent object format. But the persistent object facility went away, and along with it went the use of CAFEDEAD - it was eventually replaced by RMI."

=== General layout ===
Because the class file contains variable-sized items and does not also contain embedded file offsets (or pointers), it is typically parsed sequentially, from the first byte toward the end. At the lowest level the file format is described in terms of a few fundamental data types:

- u1: an unsigned 8-bit integer
- u2: an unsigned 16-bit integer in big-endian byte order
- u4: an unsigned 32-bit integer in big-endian byte order
- table: an array of variable-length items of some type. The number of items in the table is identified by a preceding count number (the count is a u2), but the size in bytes of the table can only be determined by examining each of its items.

Some of these fundamental types are then re-interpreted as higher-level values (such as strings or floating-point numbers), depending on context. There is no enforcement of word alignment, and so no padding bytes are ever used. The overall layout of the class file is as shown in the following table.

Byte offset	Size	Type or value	Description
0	4 bytes	u1 = 0xCA hex	magic number (CAFEBABE) used to identify file as conforming to the class file format
1	4 bytes	u1 = 0xFE hex	magic number (CAFEBABE) used to identify file as conforming to the class file format
2	4 bytes	u1 = 0xBA hex	magic number (CAFEBABE) used to identify file as conforming to the class file format
3	4 bytes	u1 = 0xBE hex	magic number (CAFEBABE) used to identify file as conforming to the class file format
4	2 bytes	u2	minor version number of the class file format being used
5	2 bytes	u2	minor version number of the class file format being used
6	2 bytes	u2	major version number of the class file format being used. Java SE 28 = 72 (0x48 hex), Java SE 27 = 71 (0x47 hex), Java SE 26 = 70 (0x46 hex), Java SE 25 = 69 (0x45 hex), Java SE 24 = 68 (0x44 hex), Java SE 23 = 67 (0x43 hex), Java SE 22 = 66 (0x42 hex), Java SE 21 = 65 (0x41 hex), Java SE 20 = 64 (0x40 hex), Java SE 19 = 63 (0x3F hex), Java SE 18 = 62 (0x3E hex), Java SE 17 = 61 (0x3D hex), Java SE 16 = 60 (0x3C hex), Java SE 15 = 59 (0x3B hex), Java SE 14 = 58 (0x3A hex), Java SE 13 = 57 (0x39 hex), Java SE 12 = 56 (0x38 hex), Java SE 11 = 55 (0x37 hex), Java SE 10 = 54 (0x36 hex), Java SE 9 = 53 (0x35 hex), Java SE 8 = 52 (0x34 hex), Java SE 7 = 51 (0x33 hex), Java SE 6.0 = 50 (0x32 hex), Java SE 5.0 = 49 (0x31 hex), JDK 1.4 = 48 (0x30 hex), JDK 1.3 = 47 (0x2F hex), JDK 1.2 = 46 (0x2E hex), JDK 1.1 = 45 (0x2D hex). For details of earlier version numbers see footnote 1 at The JavaTM Virtual Machine Specification 2nd edition
7	2 bytes	u2	
8	2 bytes	u2	constant pool count, number of entries in the following constant pool table. This count is at least one greater than the actual number of entries; see following discussion.
9	2 bytes	u2	constant pool count, number of entries in the following constant pool table. This count is at least one greater than the actual number of entries; see following discussion.
10	cpsize (variable)	table	constant pool table, an array of variable-sized constant pool entries, containing items such as literal numbers, strings, and references to classes or methods. Indexed starting at 1, containing (constant pool count - 1) number of entries in total (see note).
...	cpsize (variable)	table	constant pool table, an array of variable-sized constant pool entries, containing items such as literal numbers, strings, and references to classes or methods. Indexed starting at 1, containing (constant pool count - 1) number of entries in total (see note).
...	cpsize (variable)	table	constant pool table, an array of variable-sized constant pool entries, containing items such as literal numbers, strings, and references to classes or methods. Indexed starting at 1, containing (constant pool count - 1) number of entries in total (see note).
...	cpsize (variable)	table	constant pool table, an array of variable-sized constant pool entries, containing items such as literal numbers, strings, and references to classes or methods. Indexed starting at 1, containing (constant pool count - 1) number of entries in total (see note).
10+cpsize	2 bytes	u2	access flags, a bitmask
11+cpsize	2 bytes	u2	access flags, a bitmask
12+cpsize	2 bytes	u2	identifies this class, index into the constant pool to a "Class"-type entry
13+cpsize	2 bytes	u2	identifies this class, index into the constant pool to a "Class"-type entry
14+cpsize	2 bytes	u2	identifies super class, index into the constant pool to a "Class"-type entry
15+cpsize	2 bytes	u2	identifies super class, index into the constant pool to a "Class"-type entry
16+cpsize	2 bytes	u2	interface count, number of entries in the following interface table
17+cpsize	2 bytes	u2	interface count, number of entries in the following interface table
18+cpsize	isize (variable)	table	interface table: a variable-length array of constant pool indexes describing the interfaces implemented by this class
...	isize (variable)	table	interface table: a variable-length array of constant pool indexes describing the interfaces implemented by this class
...	isize (variable)	table	interface table: a variable-length array of constant pool indexes describing the interfaces implemented by this class
...	isize (variable)	table	interface table: a variable-length array of constant pool indexes describing the interfaces implemented by this class
18+cpsize+isize	2 bytes	u2	field count, number of entries in the following field table
19+cpsize+isize	2 bytes	u2	field count, number of entries in the following field table
20+cpsize+isize	fsize (variable)	table	field table, variable length array of fields each element is a field_info structure defined in https://docs.oracle.com/javase/specs/jvms/se8/html/jvms-4.html#jvms-4.5
...	fsize (variable)	table	field table, variable length array of fields each element is a field_info structure defined in https://docs.oracle.com/javase/specs/jvms/se8/html/jvms-4.html#jvms-4.5
...	fsize (variable)	table	field table, variable length array of fields each element is a field_info structure defined in https://docs.oracle.com/javase/specs/jvms/se8/html/jvms-4.html#jvms-4.5
...	fsize (variable)	table	field table, variable length array of fields each element is a field_info structure defined in https://docs.oracle.com/javase/specs/jvms/se8/html/jvms-4.html#jvms-4.5
20+cpsize+isize+fsize	2 bytes	u2	method count, number of entries in the following method table
21+cpsize+isize+fsize	2 bytes	u2	method count, number of entries in the following method table
22+cpsize+isize+fsize	msize (variable)	table	method table, variable length array of methods each element is a method_info structure defined in https://docs.oracle.com/javase/specs/jvms/se8/html/jvms-4.html#jvms-4.6
...	msize (variable)	table	method table, variable length array of methods each element is a method_info structure defined in https://docs.oracle.com/javase/specs/jvms/se8/html/jvms-4.html#jvms-4.6
...	msize (variable)	table	method table, variable length array of methods each element is a method_info structure defined in https://docs.oracle.com/javase/specs/jvms/se8/html/jvms-4.html#jvms-4.6
...	msize (variable)	table	method table, variable length array of methods each element is a method_info structure defined in https://docs.oracle.com/javase/specs/jvms/se8/html/jvms-4.html#jvms-4.6
22+cpsize+isize+fsize+msize	2 bytes	u2	attribute count, number of entries in the following attribute table
23+cpsize+isize+fsize+msize	2 bytes	u2	attribute count, number of entries in the following attribute table
24+cpsize+isize+fsize+msize	asize (variable)	table	attribute table, variable length array of attributes each element is an attribute_info structure defined in https://docs.oracle.com/javase/specs/jvms/se8/html/jvms-4.html#jvms-4.7
...	asize (variable)	table	attribute table, variable length array of attributes each element is an attribute_info structure defined in https://docs.oracle.com/javase/specs/jvms/se8/html/jvms-4.html#jvms-4.7
...	asize (variable)	table	attribute table, variable length array of attributes each element is an attribute_info structure defined in https://docs.oracle.com/javase/specs/jvms/se8/html/jvms-4.html#jvms-4.7
...	asize (variable)	table	attribute table, variable length array of attributes each element is an attribute_info structure defined in https://docs.oracle.com/javase/specs/jvms/se8/html/jvms-4.html#jvms-4.7

=== Representation of a class file ===
The following is a representation of a .class file as if it were a C-style struct.

struct ClassFileFormat {
   u4 magicNumber;

   u2 minorVersion;   
   u2 majorVersion;

   u2 constantPoolCount;   
  
   ConstantPoolInfo[constantPoolCount - 1] constantPool;

   u2 accessFlags;

   u2 thisClass;
   u2 superClass;

   u2 interfacesCount;   
   
   u2[interfacesCount] interfaces;

   u2 fieldsCount;   
   FieldInfo[fieldsCount] fields;

   u2 methodsCount;
   MethodInfo[methodsCount] methods;

   u2 attributesCount;   
   AttributeInfo[attributesCount] attributes;
}

=== The constant pool ===
The constant pool table is where most of the literal constant values are stored. This includes values such as numbers of all sorts, strings, identifier names, references to classes and methods, and type descriptors. All indexes, or references, to specific constants in the constant pool table are given by 16-bit (type u2) numbers, where index value 1 refers to the first constant in the table (index value 0 is invalid).

Due to historic choices made during the file format development, the number of constants in the constant pool table is not actually the same as the constant pool count which precedes the table. First, the table is indexed starting at 1 (rather than 0), but the count should actually be interpreted as the maximum index plus one. Additionally, two types of constants (longs and doubles) take up two consecutive slots in the table, although the second such slot is a phantom index that is never directly used.

The type of each item (constant) in the constant pool is identified by an initial byte tag. The number of bytes following this tag and their interpretation are then dependent upon the tag value. The valid constant types and their tag values are:

Tag byte	Additional bytes	Description of constant	Version introduced
1	2+x bytes (variable)	UTF-8 (Unicode) string: a character string prefixed by a 16-bit number (type u2) indicating the number of bytes in the encoded string which immediately follows (which may be different than the number of characters). Note that the encoding used is not actually UTF-8, but involves a slight modification of the Unicode standard encoding form.	1.0.2
3	4 bytes	Integer: a signed 32-bit two's complement number in big-endian format	1.0.2
4	4 bytes	Float: a 32-bit single-precision IEEE 754 floating-point number	1.0.2
5	8 bytes	Long: a signed 64-bit two's complement number in big-endian format (takes two slots in the constant pool table)	1.0.2
6	8 bytes	Double: a 64-bit double-precision IEEE 754 floating-point number (takes two slots in the constant pool table)	1.0.2
7	2 bytes	Class reference: an index within the constant pool to a UTF-8 string containing the fully qualified class name (in internal format) (big-endian)	1.0.2
8	2 bytes	String reference: an index within the constant pool to a UTF-8 string (big-endian too)	1.0.2
9	4 bytes	Field reference: two indexes within the constant pool, the first pointing to a Class reference, the second to a Name and Type descriptor. (big-endian)	1.0.2
10	4 bytes	Method reference: two indexes within the constant pool, the first pointing to a Class reference, the second to a Name and Type descriptor. (big-endian)	1.0.2
11	4 bytes	Interface method reference: two indexes within the constant pool, the first pointing to a Class reference, the second to a Name and Type descriptor. (big-endian)	1.0.2
12	4 bytes	Name and type descriptor: two indexes to UTF-8 strings within the constant pool, the first representing a name (identifier) and the second a specially encoded type descriptor.	1.0.2
15	3 bytes	Method handle: this structure is used to represent a method handle and consists of one byte of type descriptor, followed by an index within the constant pool.	7
16	2 bytes	Method type: this structure is used to represent a method type, and consists of an index within the constant pool.	7
17	4 bytes	Dynamic: this is used to specify a dynamically computed constant produced by invocation of a bootstrap method.	11
18	4 bytes	InvokeDynamic: this is used by an invokedynamic instruction to specify a bootstrap method, the dynamic invocation name, the argument and return types of the call, and optionally, a sequence of additional constants called static arguments to the bootstrap method.	7
19	2 bytes	Module: this is used to identify a module.	9
20	2 bytes	Package: this is used to identify a package exported or opened by a module.	9

There are only two integral constant types, int and long. Other integral types appearing in the high-level language, such as boolean, byte, and short must be represented as an integer constant.

Class names in Java, when fully qualified, are traditionally dot-separated, such as java.lang.Object. However within the low-level Class reference constants, an internal form appears which uses slashes instead, such as "java/lang/Object".

The Unicode strings, despite the moniker "UTF-8 string", are not actually encoded according to the Unicode standard, although it is similar. There are two differences (see UTF-8 for a complete discussion). The first is that the code point U+0000 is encoded as the two-byte sequence C0 80 (in hex) instead of the standard single-byte encoding 00. The second difference is that supplementary characters (those outside the BMP at U+10000 and above) are encoded using a surrogate-pair construction similar to UTF-16 rather than being directly encoded using UTF-8. In this case each of the two surrogates is encoded separately in UTF-8. For example, U+1D11E is encoded as the 6-byte sequence ED A0 B4 ED B4 9E, rather than the correct 4-byte UTF-8 encoding of F0 9D 84 9E.

== See also ==
- Java bytecode
