= Wrong Impression =

2002 single by Natalie Imbruglia

Single by Natalie Imbruglia

from the album White Lilies Island
- B-side: "Always Never"; "Hide Behind the Sun"
- Released: 11 January 2002
- Studio: Metropolis (London, England)
- Length: 3:22 (radio mix); 4:15 (album version)
- Label: RCA; BMG
- Songwriters: Natalie Imbruglia; Gary Clark
- Producer: Ian Stanley

Natalie Imbruglia singles chronology
"That Day" (2001)	"Wrong Impression" (2002)	"Beauty on the Fire" (2002)

Music video
- "Wrong Impression" on YouTube

"Wrong Impression" is a song by Australian singer-songwriter Natalie Imbruglia. The song was written by Imbruglia and Gary Clark and was released as the second single (first in the United States) from Imbruglia's second studio album, White Lilies Island (2001), on 11 January 2002. The single reached the top 10 on both the UK and New Zealand singles charts and found moderate success in Australia, the United States, and Europe.

== Track listings ==
Australasian and Japanese CD single; UK cassette single

1. "Wrong Impression" (radio mix) – 3:24
2. "Always Never" – 4:10
3. "Hide Behind the Sun" – 3:37

UK CD single

1. "Wrong Impression" (radio mix) – 3:24
2. "Always Never" – 4:10
3. "Hide Behind the Sun" – 3:37
4. "Wrong Impression" (video)

European CD single

1. "Wrong Impression" (radio mix) – 3:24
2. "Always Never" – 4:10

== Credits and personnel ==
Credits are lifted from the White Lilies Island album booklet.

Studios

- Drums recorded at Metropolis (London, England)
- Mixed at Whitfield Street Studio C (London, England)
- Mastered at 360 Mastering (London, England)

Personnel

- Natalie Imbruglia – writing
- Tessa Niles – backing vocals
- Gary Clark – writing, guitars
- Neil Taylor – guitars
- Phil Thornalley – bass
- Ian Stanley – keyboards, production, engineering
- Chuck Sabo – drums
- Maz – drums
- Marc Fox – percussion
- John Dunne – programming
- Tom Elmhirst – recording (drums)
- Dave Bascombe – mixing
- Andrew Nicholls – mixing assistance
- Jo Buckley – assistant engineering
- Dick Beetham – mastering

== Charts ==
=== Weekly charts ===
Chart (2002)	Peak position
Australia (ARIA)	33
Belgium (Ultratip Bubbling Under Flanders)	2
Belgium (Ultratip Bubbling Under Wallonia)	4
Canada CHR (Nielsen BDS)	14
Europe (Eurochart Hot 100)	58
France (SNEP)	90
Ireland (IRMA)	37
Italy (FIMI)	25
Netherlands (Dutch Top 40 Tipparade)	11
Netherlands (Single Top 100)	83
New Zealand (Recorded Music NZ)	10
Romania (Romanian Top 100)	17
Scotland Singles (OCC)	9
Switzerland (Schweizer Hitparade)	41
UK Singles (OCC)	10
US Billboard Hot 100	64
US Adult Contemporary (Billboard)	30
US Adult Pop Airplay (Billboard)	7
US Pop Airplay (Billboard)	27

=== Year-end charts ===
Chart (2002)	Position
Canada Radio (Nielsen BDS)	51
New Zealand (RIANZ)	39
UK Airplay (Music Week)	53
US Adult Top 40 (Billboard)	41

== Release history ==
Region	Date	Format(s)	Label(s)	Ref(s).
United States	11 January 2002	Contemporary hit; hot AC; triple A radio	RCA	
Germany	28 January 2002	CD	RCA; BMG	
Australia	11 February 2002	CD	RCA; BMG	
Sweden	25 February 2002	CD	RCA; BMG	
Japan	27 February 2002	CD	RCA; BMG	
United Kingdom	11 March 2002	CD; cassette	RCA; BMG	
New Zealand	18 March 2002	CD	RCA; BMG	
