= Bebop Moptop =

Studio album by Danny Wilson
- Released: 17 July 1989
- Recorded: July 1988 – April 1989
- Studio: Inner City Sound (Dundee, Scotland); The Manor (Oxfordshire); The Church (London)
- Genre: Pop
- Length: 50:29
- Label: Virgin
- Producer: Danny Wilson, Allan McGlone, Fred De Faye

Danny Wilson chronology
| Meet Danny Wilson (1987) | Bebop Moptop (1989) | Sweet Danny Wilson (1992) |

Professional ratings
Review scores
| Source | Rating |
|---|---|
| AllMusic | 1.5/5 stars |
| Hi-Fi News & Record Review | B:2 |

Bebop Moptop is the second and final album by Scottish pop group Danny Wilson.

== Track listing ==
All tracks composed by Gary Clark; except where indicated.

1. "Imaginary Girl"
2. "The Second Summer of Love"
3. "I Can't Wait" (Ged Grimes, Kit Clark)
4. "If You Really Love Me (Let Me Go)"
5. "If Everything You Said Was True"
6. "Loneliness"
7. "I Was Wrong"
8. "Charlie Boy"
9. "Never Gonna Be the Same"
10. "Desert Hearts" (Gary Clark, Ali Thomson)
11. "N.Y.C. Shanty" (Kit Clark)
12. "Goodbye Shanty Town"
13. "The Ballad of Me and Shirley Maclaine"

== Singles ==
Four songs from the album were released as singles: "The Second Summer of Love" reached number 23 in the UK music charts; "Never Gonna Be the Same" reached number 69; "I Can't Wait" reached number 92; and "If Everything You Said Was True" failed to chart.

== Personnel ==
- Gary Clark
- Ged Grimes
- Kit Clark
- Christopher Marra - rhythm guitar, pedal steel, harmonica, tuba
- Brian McDermott, David Palmer - drums
- Frank Rossiter, Gary Thomson - horns on "The Ballad of Me and Shirley Maclaine"
- Ali Thomson - background vocals on "Desert Hearts"
