= Beauty on the Fire =

2002 single by Natalie Imbruglia

Single by Natalie Imbruglia

from the album White Lilies Island
- B-side: "Broken Thread"; "Standing There"; "Cold Air"
- Released: 3 June 2002
- Studio: Studio Milk, Crashpad (London, England)
- Length: 3:54
- Label: RCA; BMG
- Songwriters: Natalie Imbruglia; Gary Clark; Matthew Wilder
- Producers: Pascal Gabriel; Gary Clark

Natalie Imbruglia singles chronology
| "Wrong Impression" (2002) | "Beauty on the Fire" (2002) | "Shiver" (2005) |

Music video
- "Beauty on the Fire" on YouTube

"Beauty on the Fire" is the third and final single from Australian singer-songwriter Natalie Imbruglia's second studio album, White Lilies Island (2001). The single charted at No. 26 in the United Kingdom, No. 27 in Italy, and No. 78 in Australia.

== Track listings ==
Australian CD single

1. "Beauty on the Fire" (radio mix) – 3:54
2. "Broken Thread" – 3:52
3. "Standing There" – 3:56
4. "Cold Air" – 5:00
5. "Beauty on the Fire" (enhanced video) – 3:54

UK CD1

1. "Beauty on the Fire" (radio mix) – 3:54
2. "Beauty on the Fire" (Junkie XL mix) – 10:42
3. "Broken Thread" – 3:52

UK CD2

1. "Beauty on the Fire" (album version) – 4:22
2. "Cold Air" – 5:00
3. "Standing There" – 3:56
4. "Beauty on the Fire" (enhanced video)

European CD single

1. "Beauty on the Fire" (radio mix) – 3:54
2. "Beauty on the Fire" (Junkie XL mix) – 10:42

== Credits and personnel ==
Credits are lifted from the White Lilies Island album booklet.

Studios

- Recorded at Studio Milk and Crashpad (London, England)
- Mixed at Strongroom (London, England)
- Mastered at 360 Mastering (London, England)

Personnel

- Natalie Imbruglia – writing
- Gary Clark – writing, guitars, production
- Matthew Wilder – writing
- Hannah Robinson – backing vocals
- Paul Statham – guitars, programming
- Neil Taylor – guitars
- Marc Fox – percussion
- James Banbury – programming
- Pascal Gabriel – production, mixing
- Tom Elmhirst – mixing
- Myles Clarke – mixing assistance
- Andrej Bako – assistant engineering
- Dick Beetham – mastering

== Charts ==
| Chart (2002) | Peak position |
|---|---|
| Australia (ARIA) | 78 |
| Belgium (Ultratip Bubbling Under Wallonia) | 10 |
| Europe (Eurochart Hot 100) | 97 |
| Italy (FIMI) | 21 |
| Scottish Singles Sales (Official Charts) | 27 |
| UK Singles (Official Charts) | 26 |

== Release history ==
| Region | Date | Format(s) | Label(s) | Ref. |
|---|---|---|---|---|
| United States | 3 June 2002 | Hot adult contemporary radio | RCA | |
| United Kingdom | 22 July 2002 | 12-inch vinyl; CD | RCA; BMG | |
| Denmark | 19 August 2002 | CD | RCA; BMG | |
| Germany | 19 August 2002 | CD | RCA; BMG | |
| Sweden | 19 August 2002 | CD | RCA; BMG | |
| Australia | 2 September 2002 | CD | RCA | |
