= Transister =

British-American alternative rock band

- Origin: Los Angeles, California, United States
- Genres: Alternative rock
- Years active: 1995–1997
- Labels: Interscope
- Members: Eric Pressly; Gary Clark; Keely Hawkes

Transister was a British-American alternative rock band formed in late 1995 in Los Angeles. Despite only having released one album to moderate sales, their work has been featured on a number of film soundtracks. The band was fronted by Keely Hawkes, the sister of English musician Chesney Hawkes and daughter of Len 'Chip' Hawkes, a member of the English beat group the Tremeloes.

== History ==
Transister's formation was the culmination of various collaborations between songwriter Eric Pressly, former Danny Wilson frontman Gary Clark, and vocalist Keely Hawkes. Hawkes first made use of Pressly's songwriting on her 1993 solo debut for EMI, while Pressly and Clark first worked together in the band King L, releasing the album Great Day for Gravity in 1995. The three were encouraged by the results of their early songwriting attempts, and decided to release a six-song EP on their record label.

Transister began to attract major label attention after KCRW DJ Christopher Douridas played a few of the self-recorded tracks on Morning Becomes Eclectic in early 1996. Interscope Records released Transister's self-titled debut in the US in 1997; UK and international distribution was handled by Virgin Records. Tracks from the album were featured on a number of film soundtracks, including Nightwatch (1997), Wild Things (1998), Jawbreaker (1999), Never Been Kissed (1999), Charlie's Angels (2000) and Cheaters (2000). Although members of the band have since gone on to other projects, Hawkes and Pressly maintained a relationship and were married on January 8, 2005.

Their song "Look Who's Perfect Now" entered the UK Singles Chart, where it peaked at No. 56 in March 1998. "Look Who's Perfect Now" also charted in Australia, where it peaked at No. 76 in June 1998. A second single, "Dizzy Moon" peaked at No. 90 in the UK in July 1998.

== Discography ==
=== Album ===
- Transister (Interscope, 1997 / Virgin Records, 1998)

=== Singles ===
List of singles, with selected chart positions
Title	Year	Peak chart positions		Album
Title	Year	UK	AUS	Album
"Look Who's Perfect Now"	1998	56	76	Transister
"Dizzy Moon"	1998	90	—	Transister
