= Meet Danny Wilson (album) =

Studio album by Danny Wilson
- Released: April 6, 1987
- Genres: Avant-garde pop; sophisti-pop
- Length: 48:44
- Label: Virgin
- Producers: Dave Bascombe; Glenn Skinner; Howard Gray; Allan McGlone; Danny Wilson

Danny Wilson chronology
Meet Danny Wilson (1987)	Bebop Moptop (1989)

Professional ratings
Review scores
Source	Rating
Artists Direct	4.5/5 stars
Rolling Stone	4/5 stars

Meet Danny Wilson is the debut album by Scottish pop group Danny Wilson. It became a significant hit in America on the strength of the summer of 1987 hit single "Mary's Prayer". In Canada, it spent 3 weeks at number 88.

== Track listing ==
All tracks composed by Gary Clark.

1. "Davy" (3:27)
2. "Aberdeen" (2:23)
3. "Mary's Prayer" (3:52)
4. "Lorraine Parade" (3:40)
5. "Nothing Ever Goes to Plan" (3:46)
6. "Broken China" (4:25)
7. "Steamtrains to the Milky Way" (4:27)
8. "Spencer-Tracey" (1:27)
9. "You Remain an Angel" (4:53)
10. "Ruby's Golden Wedding" (3:10)
11. "A Girl I Used to Know" (3:52)
12. "Five Friendly Aliens" (4:38)
13. "I Won't Be Here When You Get Home" (4:02)

== Personnel ==
=== Danny Wilson ===
- Gary Clark
- Gerard Grimes
- Kit Clark

=== Additional musicians ===
Note: These artists, as they appear in the album credits, are not listed with any specific instruments. However, if there is a specific instrument commonly associated with the musician, it is listed after the artist's name below.

- Allan McGlone
- David Palmer - drums
- Geoff Dugmore - drums
- Nils Tuxen - pedal steel guitar
- Roddy Lorimer - trumpet

with:

- Lester Bowie's Brass Fantasy

== Notes ==
The recording of "A Girl I Used to Know" on the CD version is very different to the vinyl LP version. According to Gary Clark, the reason for the re-recording was that the band members weren't very happy with the original performance. This dissatisfaction, coupled with the record company looking for big singles from the album, meant the band felt compelled to try and capture the song again. The CD version was produced by Glen Skinner, while the LP version was produced by Dave Bascombe, who also produced the song "Mary's Prayer" from the same album. An extended version of the Dave Bascombe recording appears on the 1991 hits collection Sweet Danny Wilson.

"Broken China" appears in two reprise versions in "Spencer-Tracey" and in the end of "Five Friendly Aliens".

The song "Mary's Prayer" is featured in the 1998 film There's Something About Mary and is listed on the movie soundtrack.

"Nothing Ever Goes to Plan" is bossa nova.

The album also boasts an appearance by American jazz trumpeter Lester Bowie's Brass Fantasy.

In 2010, Australian actor/singer Jason Donovan recorded a cover version of "Mary's Prayer" for his '80s covers album Soundtrack of the 80s. The album went top 20 in the UK in October 2010.
