= Mary's Prayer =

Single by Danny Wilson

from the album Meet Danny Wilson
- B-side: "Monkey's Shiny Day"
- Released: February 1987
- Genre: Sophisti-pop
- Length: 3:52
- Label: Virgin
- Songwriter: Gary Clark
- Producer: Dave Bascombe

Official video
- "Mary's Prayer" on YouTube

"Mary's Prayer" is the debut single by Scottish pop/rock group Danny Wilson. Included on the group's 1987 debut album Meet Danny Wilson, "Mary's Prayer" became a top ten hit in Britain and Ireland, and was a top 40 hit in the US.

The music video for "Mary's Prayer" was directed by Su Huntley and Donna Muir.

== Background ==
The song's composer, Gary Clark, said of "Mary's Prayer": "I certainly don't think [it's] the best song on the album, but it is probably the most accessible, and therefore the best choice for a first single." Clark had written "Mary's Prayer" while Danny Wilson was the house band at Dundee nightclub the Swamp soon after the group (then known as Spencer Tracy) formed in 1984.

The song has been described as "an extended Catholic metaphor," although Clark has denied any intended religious significance in his composition: "It is basically just a simple love song. In fact, I like to think of it as being like a country and western song. There is a lot of religious imagery in the song, but that is really just a device to relate past, present, and future."

"Mary's Prayer" was released as a single three times between February 1987 and March 1988 in the UK, reaching number 3 on the UK Singles Chart on its third release. The initial UK release in February 1987 peaked at only number 86, but was a hit in Ireland (number 5), Germany (number 35) and South Africa (number 10).

The June 1987 US release of "Mary's Prayer" afforded the single a peak of number 23 on the Billboard Hot 100, while on Billboard's Adult Contemporary chart, the song rose as high as number 6. Virgin Records US' promotion for the single included a full-page advertisement run in the music industry trade journals with an endorsement from Mike Bone, head of promotion for rival label Elektra Records. The advertisement reproduced a cable Bone sent to Virgin Records that said "'Mary's Prayer' is my life" and prompted "Do Mike Bone a Favor. Add Danny Wilson's 'Mary's Prayer'." Bone had given permission for Virgin Records to use his endorsement to promote the single, but "thought they'd just have it buried [among] other testimonials." The song failed to chart during its original release in the UK.

The US success of "Mary's Prayer" triggered a second UK single release in August 1987, with a resultant number 42 UK chart peak. The single subsequently topped a BBC Radio 1 phone-in poll of listeners nominations for 1987 singles which had failed to be hits. Clark credits this poll with the Virgin Records UK decision to reissue "Mary's Prayer" a third time in March 1988, with this release resulting in a number 3 UK chart peak. The March 1988 UK release of "Mary's Prayer" was labelled "the Paul Staveley O'Duffy remix" but, according to Gary Clark, "[Although] they did a remix on it...it was essentially the same record".

On 24 September 2014, the members of Danny Wilson performed "Mary's Prayer" at the opening gala for the Ryder Cup at the Hydro Arena in Glasgow, marking the sole performance by the band since 1989.

== Personnel ==
- Gary Clark – lead vocal, guitar
- Gerard Grimes – bass
- Kit Clark – guitars, backing vocals

== Charts ==
Chart (1987–1988)	Peak position
Australia (Kent Music Report)	64
Canada Top Singles (RPM)	13
Ireland (IRMA)	5
Israel (IBA)	4
Europe (European Hot 100 Singles)	8
South Africa (Springbok Radio)	9
UK Singles (Official Charts)	3
US Billboard Hot 100	23
US Adult Contemporary (Billboard)	6
West Germany (GfK)	35

== Certifications ==
Region	Certification	Certified units/sales
United Kingdom (BPI)	Silver	200,000^{‡}
^{‡} Sales+streaming figures based on certification alone.

== Cover versions ==
In 1996, "Mary's Prayer" was remade by the Scottish Eurodance outfit DC Project, and the release was supported by a UK-wide tour. It went on to gain international success, reaching number one on the charts in a number of countries including Brazil. The lead track on the release was the "FM Edit", produced by Brian Rawling.

A remake of "Mary's Prayer" by BBMak served as the B-side of their 2000 top 10 UK hit "Still on Your Side". The song has also been covered by Jason Donovan, his version appearing on his 2010 album Soundtrack of the 80s.

The Jeremy Days' Dirk Darmstädter covered the song in 2022.

== In popular culture ==
"Mary's Prayer" was featured in the 1998 hit film There's Something About Mary. The 2019 film Blinded by the Light also features the song.
