= That Day (Natalie Imbruglia song) =

2001 single by Natalie Imbruglia

Single by Natalie Imbruglia

from the album White Lilies Island
- B-side: "Shikaiya (For Billy)"; "Just Another Day"
- Released: 3 October 2001
- Studio: Westside (London, England)
- Length: 4:04 (radio edit)
- Label: RCA; BMG
- Songwriters: Natalie Imbruglia; Patrick Leonard
- Producer: Ian Stanley

Natalie Imbruglia singles chronology
| "Identify" (1999) | "That Day" (2001) | "Wrong Impression" (2002) |

Music video
- "That Day" on YouTube

"That Day" is a song by Australian singer-songwriter Natalie Imbruglia, released as the first single from her second album, White Lilies Island (2001). In Australia, the song reached number 10, while in the United Kingdom, it peaked at number 11. The song also charted well in Italy, peaking at number 14, and in Sweden, where it reached number 34. RCA Records chose not to release "That Day" in the United States, where "Wrong Impression" served as the album's lead single instead.

== Composition and style ==
The song was written by Natalie Imbruglia and Patrick Leonard. Imbruglia said she struggled with writer's block after the success of "Torn", as a result of the pressure she felt from her record label to deliver a successful follow-up. In 2026, she said she hoped it would "never be that hard" again, and that "releasing a song called 'That Day', with no chorus, was my two fingers up. Like, there is not a second 'Torn'."

== Track listings ==
Australian and Japanese CD single

1. "That Day" – 4:04
2. "Shikaiya (For Billy)" – 3:41
3. "Just Another Day" – 4:22

UK CD single

1. "That Day" – 4:43
2. "Shikaiya (For Billy)" – 3:40
3. "Just Another Day" – 4:24
4. "That Day" (enhanced video)

UK cassette single and European CD single

1. "That Day" – 4:43
2. "Shikaiya (For Billy)" – 3:40

== Credits and personnel ==
Credits are lifted from the White Lilies Island album booklet.

Studios

- Drums recorded at Westside (London, England)
- Mixed at Whitfield Street Studio C (London, England)
- Mastered at 360 Mastering (London, England)

Personnel

- Natalie Imbruglia – writing
- Patrick Leonard – writing
- Viveen Wray – backing vocals
- Neil Taylor – guitars
- Guy Pratt – bass
- Ian Stanley – keyboards, production, mixing, engineering
- Maz – drums
- Marc Fox – percussion
- John Dunne – programming
- Gary Langan – recording (drums)
- Dave Bascombe – mixing
- Andrew Nicholls – mixing assistance
- Jo Buckley – assistant engineering
- Dick Beetham – mastering

== Charts ==
| Chart (2001) | Peak position |
|---|---|
| Australia (ARIA) | 10 |
| Belgium (Ultratip Bubbling Under Flanders) | 12 |
| Belgium (Ultratip Bubbling Under Wallonia) | 11 |
| Europe (Eurochart Hot 100) | 37 |
| Ireland (IRMA) | 47 |
| Italy (FIMI) | 14 |
| Netherlands (Single Top 100) | 87 |
| Scottish Singles Sales (Official Charts) | 10 |
| Sweden (Sverigetopplistan) | 34 |
| Switzerland (Schweizer Hitparade) | 75 |
| UK Singles (Official Charts) | 11 |

== Release history ==
| Region | Date | Format(s) | Label(s) | Ref. |
|---|---|---|---|---|
| Japan | 3 October 2001 | CD | RCA; BMG Japan | |
| Germany | 21 October 2001 | CD | RCA; BMG | |
| Australia | 29 October 2001 | CD | RCA; BMG | |
| Sweden | 29 October 2001 | CD | RCA; BMG | |
| United Kingdom | 29 October 2001 | CD | RCA; BMG | |
