= MediaMax =

Copy protection scheme

MediaMax Technology

MediaMax, sometimes referred to as MediaMax CD-3 is a software package created by SunnComm which was sold as a form of copy protection for compact discs. It was used by the record label RCA Records/BMG, and targets both Microsoft Windows and Mac OS X. Elected officials and computer security experts regard the software as a form of malware since its purpose is to intercept and inhibit normal computer operation without the user's authorization. MediaMax received media attention in late 2005 in fallout from the Sony XCP copy protection scandal.

MediaMax is a second-generation system meant to address the problems of earlier copy-preventing schemes, where many types of playback devices had difficulty reading discs in normal use. MediaMax was first used on Anthony Hamilton's Comin' From Where I'm From in the United States; the first US No. 1 CD to use it was Velvet Revolver's Contraband. (The European release of the Velvet Revolver album used Macrovision CDS-200 and the Japanese is without copy protection.)

== Identifying MediaMax discs ==
Some BMG discs using the scheme have a label affixed to the front that states:

This CD is protected against unauthorized duplication. It is designed to play on standard playback devices and an appropriately configured computer (see system requirements on back). If you have questions or concerns visit www.sunncomm.com/support/bmg

A section on the back of some packages states, in part:

This CD is enhanced with MediaMax software. Windows compatible instructions: Insert disc into CD-ROM drive. Software will automatically install. If it doesn't, click on "LaunchCd.exe." MacOS instructions: Insert disc into CD-ROM drive. Click on "Start." Usage of the CD on your computer requires your acceptance of the End User License Agreement and installation of specific software contained on the CD.

== Method of operation ==
The music on a MediaMax disc is contained in tracks as on a regular compact disc, while the DRM software is present in an additional data track. Therefore, such discs work with almost any CD playback device. Copy restriction is only enforced by the software on the disc: If the software is not installed, disc duplication is not inhibited.

On computers running Microsoft Windows, the typical installation vector is the AutoRun feature of the operating system. When a MediaMax disc is inserted into a Windows PC with AutoRun enabled, software on the disc called LaunchCd.exe installs a device driver that inhibits the ability of other software to directly read data from audio discs in the CD-ROM drive(s).

The installation program displays an end user license agreement (EULA) with options to accept or decline the agreement. The user is informed that they must accept the terms of this EULA to use the CD on their computer, but the DRM software is installed without notice, even if they decline, cancel, or terminate the program.

In Mac OS X, applications cannot run automatically when a disc is inserted, and furthermore when manually running the application, it cannot install anything on the system without consent, requiring administrative credentials from the user. There is no version of MediaMax for Linux distributions or any other operating systems.

== Controversy ==
The software's propensity to permanently modify the computer's behaviour without knowledge or consent has caused controversy. MediaMax departs from the convention of digital rights management (DRM) software by ignoring a user's desire to decline the installation. While it displays a license agreement with options to accept or decline, the DRM is installed regardless of the user's choice. When this functionality was brought to SunnComm's attention, the Company resolved the problem by issuing an update that ensured that its DRM would never be installed on a user's computer should the EULA be subsequently declined by that user. This technology update was then applied to all previously sold music CDs (whose users had internet connectivity) as well as to all MediaMax CDs sold in the future.

Some artists whose albums were sold with the MediaMax software were dissatisfied that it was put on their compact discs without their consent. The rock band My Morning Jacket offered advice on their website on how to bypass MediaMax, which was included on their 2005 album Z, and also offered to burn individual copies of the album for fans, free of the copy-protection software.

== Alternate options ==
Because of its dependence on AutoRun on Windows systems, the MediaMax restrictions can be bypassed by a conscientious user as follows.

Users concerned about installing software from discs without their permission can disable the AutoRun feature on their computer. People who do not disable AutoRun can prevent the software from loading by holding down the shift key each time a disc is inserted.

== Identification and removal ==
Windows PCs with MediaMax installed are identifiable by their having a Windows service installed named "sbcphid." MediaMax's stealth install provides no uninstall option, in keeping with the absence of notification that the installation happened. However, in contrast to the previous XCP copy protection components used by Sony/BMG, the Windows service that MediaMax installs can be safely and easily stopped, disabled and removed. Users with administrative privileges can accomplish this via Windows' Service Controller ("sc") command line utility (using the "stop" and "delete" arguments), after which MediaMax's driver file (sbcphid.sys) can be deleted from the Windows\System32\Drivers directory and additional files can be deleted from the Program Files\Common Files\SunnComm Shared\ directory.

To determine if MediaMax is installed on a Windows PC, one may launch a command prompt, from which the Service Control Manager can be queried. The command to test this is sc query sbcphid. If installed, sc stop sbcphid will halt the service, and sc delete sbcphid will prevent it from automatically starting on subsequent reboots.

Once installed, the MediaMax software looks for a watermark inside all raw CD audio to recognize protected content. If the software detects protected audio, it distorts the audio to prevent unauthorized copying. The watermark works by setting a sequence of low order bits to 1. This makes the watermark very brittle, and it will be defeated by most transformations of the audio, including converting it to MP3 and back.

When the MediaMax software is functioning as designed, it allows copying to a certain extent. Compressed audio is stored on the disc in Windows Media Audio (WMA) files. The following activities are allowed: Copying tracks to the hard drive for playback without the original CD, burning up to three copies of the CD, and sharing email links to DRM-protected tracks that expire after ten days. Finally, tracks may be downloaded to DRM-enabled portable players.
