= Mpg123 =

Open source audio player

mpg123
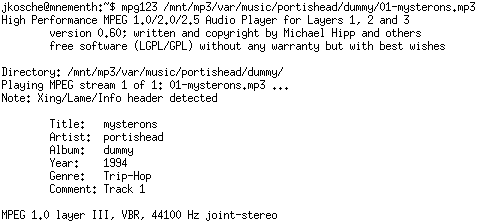
- Original authors: Michael Hipp, Oliver Fromme
- Developer: Thomas Orgis
- Release: before 1997-04-27
- Stable release: 1.33.6 / 6 June 2026
- Written in: C, Assembly
- Operating system: Unix-like, Windows
- Type: Audio player
- License: LGPL-2.1-only
- Website: mpg123.org
- Repository: sourceforge.net/projects/mpg123/

mpg123 is a free and open-source audio player. It supports MPEG audio formats, including MP3.

As a console application, it has no graphical user interface.

mpg123's Assembly code is optimized with SIMD instructions to improve the performance of the iDCT part of the MPEG decoding.

mpg123's decoding library, libmpg123 is used by DeaDBeeF, Audacious, XMMS and Winamp (version 5.8) for MP3 playback and can be used in Winamp before version 5.8 via a plugin.

== History ==
First known presence is in Debian Linux distribution, where it was submitted to repositories with version 0.59f on 27 April 1997 and it already had MP3 support ("MPEG layer 1/2/3 audio player"). The license for the last release (0.59r / 19 June 1999) from the original authors included restrictive (non-commercial, no-derivative) terms, although the source code was available. This led to the creation of mpg321, a similar program (based on MAD) licensed under the GPLv2.

Official development of mpg123 and its library mpglib stalled, and serious security holes emerged. Patches were applied downstream for packages provided by various Linux and BSD operating systems.

In 2006, a new maintainer started work towards the release of a new official mpg123 package. After several security rollup releases in the 0.6.x series, version 1.0 was released in 2007 under the LGPLv2.1, with libmpg123 as a replacement for mpglib.

== See also ==
- Comparison of audio player software
- ogg123 (A similar program that plays Ogg Vorbis files. Released with the vorbis-tools reference software.)
- madplay
