= Enterprise Privacy Authorization Language =

Formal language

Enterprise Privacy Authorization Language (EPAL) is a formal language for writing enterprise privacy policies to govern data handling practices in IT systems according to fine-grained positive and negative authorization rights. It was submitted by IBM to the World Wide Web Consortium (W3C) in 2003 to be considered for recommendation.

== Lawsuit ==
In 2004, a lawsuit was filed by Zero-Knowledge Systems claiming that IBM breached a copyright agreement from when they worked together in 2001 - 2002 to create Privacy Rights Markup Language (PRML). EPAL is based on PRML, which means Zero-Knowledge argued they should be a co-owner of the standard.

== See also ==
- XACML - eXtensible Access Control Markup Language
