= Ged Grimes =

Scottish musician (born 1962)

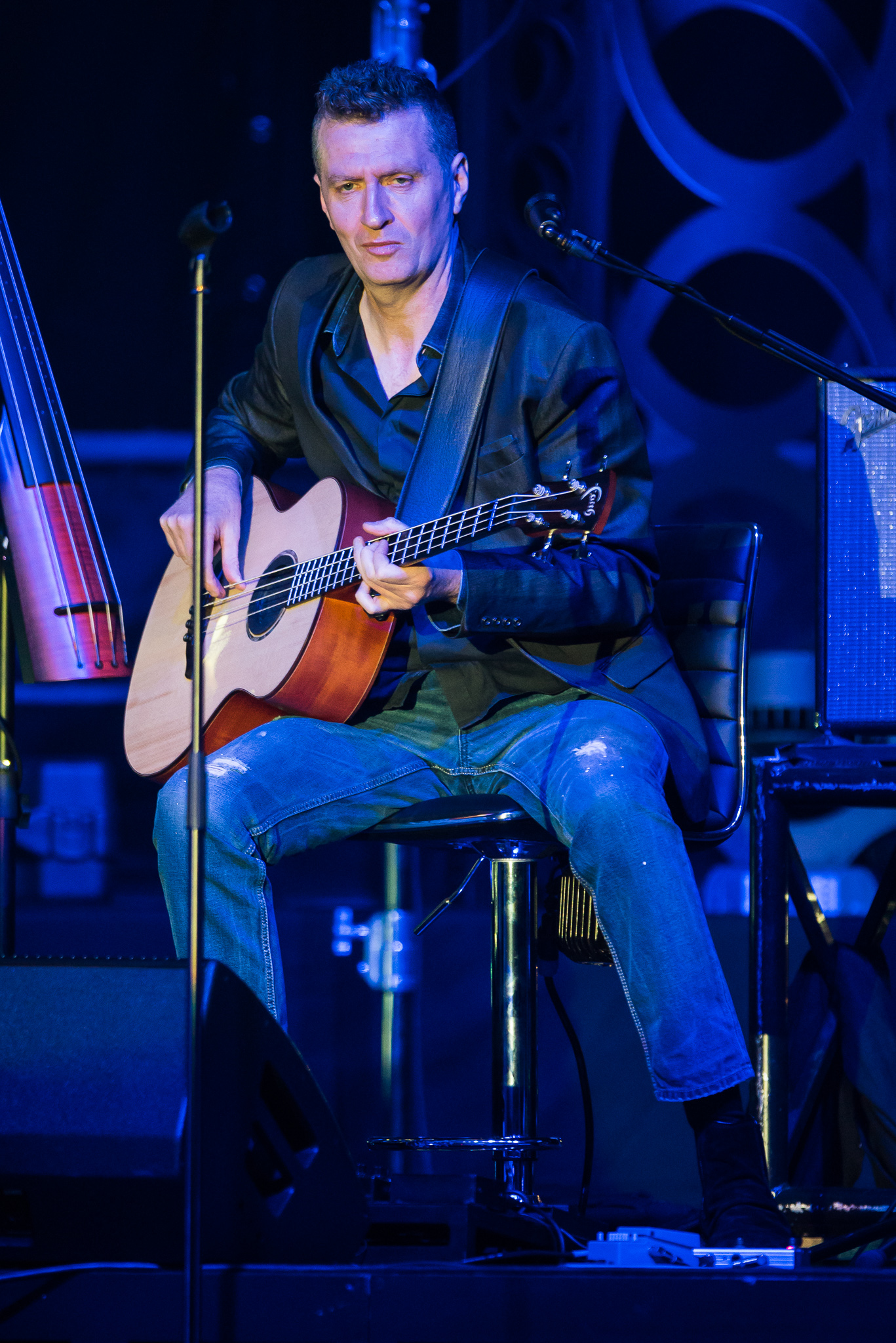
- Grimes performing with Simple Minds in 2017

Background information
- Born: Ged Grimes; 28 March 1962 (age 64)
- Origin: Dundee, Scotland, UK
- Genres: Rock; folk; new wave; pop rock
- Occupations: Musician, producer, composer
- Instruments: Bass, vocals
- Member of: Simple Minds
- Formerly of: Danny Wilson; Deacon Blue
- Website: SimpleMinds.com

Ged Grimes (born 28 March 1962) is a Scottish musician, producer and composer. He is currently the bass player for rock band Simple Minds, and was a founding member of Scottish pop band Danny Wilson whose hits include "Mary's Prayer" (from Meet Danny Wilson and featured prominently in the Original Motion Picture Soundtrack to the movie There's Something About Mary), and "The Second Summer of Love" (from Bebop Moptop).

== Musical career ==
=== After Danny Wilson ===
After the break-up of Danny Wilson, Grimes began to focus on writing, performing, and producing other artists including Eddi Reader and Natalie Imbruglia.

Grimes has also done a substantial amount of work for television, film, and games. His television credits include Tartan Shorts. As the owner of Jack's Hoose Music, Grimes has worked on a number of interactive entertainment media projects. Grimes composed the soundtrack for the PC game Earthworm Jim 3D; other Jack's Hoose Music projects included score material for Universal Pictures, including work featured on the trailer for The Bourne Supremacy. Grimes has been featured on tracks for Sony PS2's (PlayStation 2) DJ Decks and FX, music themes for a series of mobile games for Digital Bridges, including movie franchise The Fast and the Furious, and the interactive music soundtrack to Namco Japan's rhythm action title, "Rhythmic Star". Grimes' projects include title themes for Sky Games including Shrek the Third (video game), Ben 10, Goldenballs and the Latin American flavoured soundtrack to iPhone and iPad game Quarrel.

Grimes, who is fluent in the Spanish language, relocated from Dundee in Scotland, UK, to Andalucia, Spain, in 2005 and ran Jack's Hoose Music's international, day-to-day business from there.

Grimes has also been a member of Deacon Blue. He played bass on the first live incarnation of Lostboy! AKA Jim Kerr, appearing on the short Lostboy! AKA Promo Tour 2010.

=== Joining Simple Minds (2010–present) ===
On 11 September 2010, Grimes made his debut as Simple Minds' new bass player. His first live appearance with Simple Minds took place in Paris, France, at the Fête de l'Humanité festival. Simple Minds were headlining and played in front of an audience of 80,000 that evening.

Grimes featured on the band's Celebrate – Live at the Glasgow SSE Hydro DVD (recorded in 2013) and played on the subsequent albums Big Music and Walk between Worlds, and contributed two songs (Solstice Kiss and First You Jump) to Direction of the Heart.

He wrote and produced the 2019 game soundtrack “The Bard’s Tale IV” collaborating with many of Scotland’s leading Gaelic artistes, including Kathleen MacInnes, Mànran, Mackenzie and Eilidh Cormack.

He contributed music to Nintendo Switch's Skye Tale, and Xbox's Clockwork Revolution.

== Instruments ==
Grimes is an official endorser of the Sandberg Guitars California PM bass guitar. On 21 July 2011, Markbass products announced they had also picked up Grimes' endorsement.
