= MPEG Audio Decoder =

madplay
- Developer: Robert Leslie
- Release: 2000
- Stable release: 0.15.2b / February 23, 2004
- Written in: C
- Operating system: Linux, FreeBSD, macOS
- Type: Media player
- License: GPLv2
- Website: underbit.com/products/mad/
- Repository: sourceforge.net/projects/mad/

MPEG Audio Decoder (MAD) is a GPL library for decoding files that have been encoded with an MPEG audio codec. It was written by Robert Leslie and produced by Underbit Technologies. It was developed as a new implementation, on the ISO/IEC standards.

It consists of libmad, a software library, and madplay, a command-line program for MP3 playback. libmad is notable for using only fixed-point arithmetic while madplay is notable for its ReplayGain support.

Development ended decades ago, and vulnerabilities identified since then have gone unpatched.
