= CA Anti-Spyware =

Spyware detection program

CA Anti-Spyware (previously PestPatrol)
- Scan results page from eTrust PestPatrol
- Developer: CA Technologies
- Stable release: (Total Defense Anti-Virus)
- Operating system: Microsoft Windows (Microsoft Windows 7, Windows Vista, and Windows XP)
- Type: Anti spyware
- License: Proprietary

CA Anti-Spyware is a spyware detection program distributed by CA, Inc. Until 2007, it was known as PestPatrol.

This product is now offered by Total Defense, Inc. and has been named Total Defense Anti-Virus.

== History ==
PestPatrol, Inc. was a Carlisle, PA based software company founded by Dr. David Stang and Robert Bales, which developed PestPatrol and released its first version in 2000. Originally called SaferSite, the company changed its name in 2002 to better reflect the focus of the company.

PestPatrol was an anti-malware product, designed to protect a computer system against threats such as adware, spyware and viruses. It performed automated scans of a system's hard disks, Windows registry and other crucial system areas, and enabled manual scans for specific threats, selected from a very long list of known malicious software. Among its unique features were CookiePatrol, which purges spyware cookies, and KeyPatrol, which detects keyloggers. Unlike most anti-spyware programs designed for home use on a single desktop, PestPatrol also provided a solution for the network environments found in enterprises. Among the features that made it appealing for enterprise security administrators was the ability to manage networked desktops remotely.

Early versions of the product were criticized for the poor user interface, described alternatively as something that "looks like an application that was ported from OS/2, with unclear buttons" or a "clunky, text-based UI", but the reviewers praised its malware detection and removal capabilities, stating "PestPatrol is the most effective anti-spyware system - short of a switch to Linux - that we've ever used".

It was described by InfoWorld as "one of the most established brands in anti-spyware", and in 2002, it was selected as "Security product of year" by Network World, which cited its ability to detect and remove more than 60,000 types of malware, and its defenses against Remote Administration Tools (RATs).

Billing itself as the "Authority in Spyware Protection," it licensed its signature files for use in Yahoo! Companion and others. In 2003, along with other anti-spyware and anti-malware companies such as Webroot, Lavasoft and Aluria, it formed an industry consortium to fight malware called the Consortium of Antispyware Technology (COAST).

Computer Associates (now CA Technologies) bought PestPatrol in 2004 and made it a part of its eTrust computer security line, which includes a virus scanner and a firewall. Using the newly acquired technology, CA created a bundle named CA Integrated Threat Management (ITM), which consisted of an anti-virus solution and the PestPatrol anti-spyware.

Renamed CA Anti-Spyware in 2007, the program can be bought separately, or as part of CA Internet Security.

In 2007, the CA Anti-Spyware team was instrumental in exposing the fact that Facebook was collecting personal information about their users, without their knowledge, even when those users opted out of Facebook's ill-fated Beacon program, and even when those users were not logged into Facebook.
