= File signature =

A file signature is data used to identify or verify the contents of a file. In particular, it may refer to:

- File magic number: bytes within a file used to identify the format of the file; see list of file signatures.
- File checksum or more generally the result of a hash function over the file contents: data used to verify the integrity of the file contents, generally against transmission errors or malicious attacks. The signature can be included at the end of the file or in a separate file.
