= Gary Clark (musician) =

British singer

Gary Clark is a Scottish musician, songwriter and record producer. As a performer, he was the frontman of 1980s pop band Danny Wilson. He was also a member of the bands King L and Transister.

== Career ==
=== Performer – Danny Wilson, solo, King L, Transister ===
In 1987, the band Danny Wilson released its first album, Meet Danny Wilson. The first single, "Mary's Prayer", written by Clark, was a worldwide hit, reaching number 3 in the UK Singles Chart, and number 23 on the United States Billboard Hot 100 chart, earning him a BMI award, and a nomination for an Ivor Novello award for Best Song Musically and Lyrically. A second album, Bebop Moptop, was released in 1989, including hit single "Second Summer of Love" which reached number 23 in the UK Singles Chart. The band split in 1991.

Following the break-up of Danny Wilson, Clark embarked on a solo career. He released a 1993 solo album called Ten Short Songs About Love on Virgin Records subsidiary Circa Records, with the assistance of the other Danny Wilson members.

Clark then formed a rock band called King L (with bass player Eric Pressly, former Bible guitarist Neill MacColl and drummer Matt Laug). The band released an album, A Great Day For Gravity, in 1995. Clark and Pressly then formed the pop trio Transister with Pressly's girlfriend Keely Hawkes.

=== Songwriter, producer and composer ===
Clark has also worked as a songwriter, record producer and film score composer. He co-wrote and produced much of Lauren Christy's album Breed.

Clark's collaboration with Natalie Imbruglia began when he and Eric Pressly remixed the single "Wishing I Was There" from her 1997 Left of the Middle album. He co-wrote and produced eight tracks on her subsequent album White Lilies Island, and has contributed songs to all of her albums after that – Counting Down the Days, Glorious: The Singles 1997-2007, and Come to Life.

Clark produced and co-wrote the song "Got Dynamite" for Demi Lovato on her 2009 number one album Here We Go Again. In 2012, he co-wrote and produced ten songs on Delta Goodrem's album Child of the Universe, including the ARIA top 5 single "Wish You Were Here". Clark also co-wrote the Veronicas song "Cold".

As a composer, Clark co-composed and co-performed the music on the 2016 film Sing Street and the 2026 film Power Ballad.

He was executive music producer for both seasons of Modern Love on Amazon Prime, for which he co-wrote and performed the theme song "Setting Sail".

Clark is writing the music and lyrics with Emma Thompson for the stage musical Nanny McPhee which is due to open at The Aldwych Theatre in London's West End in autumn 2027.
