= White Lilies Island =

Studio album by Natalie Imbruglia
- Released: 5 November 2001
- Recorded: 2001
- Studios: Westside Studios (London, England); Studio Milk (London, England); Crashpad (London, England); Swamp Studio (London, England); Olympic Studios (London, England); Air Lyndhurst (London, England)
- Genre: Pop rock
- Length: 51:29
- Label: RCA
- Producers: Gary Clark; Pascal Gabriel; Ian Stanley; Phil Thornalley

Natalie Imbruglia chronology
Left of the Middle (1997)	White Lilies Island (2001)	Counting Down the Days (2005)

Singles from White Lilies Island
- 1. "That Day" Released: 29 October 2001; 2. "Wrong Impression" Released: 11 March 2002; 3. "Beauty on the Fire" Released: 22 July 2002

White Lilies Island is the second studio album by Australian singer-songwriter Natalie Imbruglia. It was released by RCA Records on 5 November 2001 in most international territories and on 5 March 2002 in the United States. For this album, Imbruglia collaborated with songwriter, Gary Clark, with whom she co-wrote majority of the album material. Other collaborators include Phil Thornalley, who was a major contributor of her previous album, as well as Ian Stanley, Matt Wilder and Patrick Leonard. Attempting to take more control of her creative direction, Imbruglia admitted that she suffered from writer's block, perfectionism and isolation during the recording process. The album is named after the location of Imbruglia's home in Windsor.

Musically, White Lilies Island is a rock album, with element of pop, and acoustic sounds. The album was notable for being the first to include copy protection software on compact disc pressing, but later removed due to surrounding technical faults that resulted to consumer outcry. Upon release, White Lilies Island received polarized reviews, while some critics praised the album for its dark and distinctive tone compared to her predecessor. Commercially, the album charted within top five in Australia, top twenty in the United Kingdom, and top forty in the United States. White Lilies Island has sold one million copies worldwide.

== Background ==
In May 1998, during a backstage interview at the MTV Movie Awards, Imbruglia said she was writing new material. The following month, she told the Washington Post that she had begun sketching songs for her second album and would collaborate again with Phil Thornalley and Dave Stewart, but emphasized she would not rush the process. At the 13th ARIA Music Awards, she told presenter Molly Meldrum that the album was "coming along fine." and in early 2000, when Imbruglia was being interviewed by Chris Evans on TFI Friday, Imbruglia said she had been writing intensively for the album while maintaining a balanced life. Further commenting on the album's writing process, Imbruglia told Billboard that she preferred to invest her time in developing as a songwriter rather than chasing hit songs. She revealed that she had written 64 new songs, only to discard them all and start over.

Imbruglia chose to name her album White Lilies Island as she wanted to associate the album with the location where most of the songwriting took place. For the singer, the island could be meant as bliss and paradise but also a total isolation which contributed to her complex feelings during the process of making the album. Imbruglia emphasized that it was essential for her to be a major contributor for every song on the album, highlighting the pressure she had felt after the unexpected worldwide success of her debut single, "Torn" which had been a cover. She also stated that she'd have liked to write songs in her bedroom during afternoon and that being single at the time helped her finish the album the way she wanted. For all the songs on the album, Imbruglia highlighted "Butterflies" as the first song she wrote which helped her determine the overall sound and mood for the album, as well as "That Day" which she favored due to its distinctive style.

== Singles ==
"That Day," produced by Ian Stanley, was released on 29 October 2001 as the lead single of the album internationally. Imbruglia commended RCA Records for their decision to release it as the lead single from White Lilies Island internationally, despite its unconventional style and potential commercial risk. The song peaked at number 10 on ARIA Singles Chart and number 11 on the UK Singles Chart. "Wrong Impression" was released on 29 January 2002 as the second single of the album internationally, and the lead single in North America. It peaked at number seven on the US Billboard Adult Top 40, and number 10 in the United Kingdom and New Zealand. "Beauty on the Fire," co-produced by Pascal Gabriel, was released on 22 July 2002 as the third and final single from White Lilies Island. It peaked at number 26 on the UK Singles Chart and reached number 21 on the Italian Singles Chart.

== Copy protection ==
White Lilies Island is notable for being the first album to implement copy protection on compact disc. To prevent consumers from illicitly copying the album, a 24.5 megabyte data file is included on the disc that interferes with the methods by which personal computers read the twelve audio tracks. Instead of reading outwards from the centre, PC CD-ROM drives usually start reading inwards from the outermost end of the data track. The copy protection scheme takes advantage of this difference by offering them a separate data session and appearing as a CD-ROM instead of an Audio CD. The data section contains a second, highly compressed representation of the same music content, which allows playback on PCs, but with a greatly reduced audio quality compared to the actual CDDA data (at a data rate of 80 kbit/s rather than the standard 1.4 Mbit/s). Additionally, the copy protection software prevents some Macintosh computers and all Philips CD recorders from reading the disc and causes other Macs to avoid playing track one; this latter fault is also present when trying to play the disc on a PlayStation 2 video game console. No message exists on the disc's packaging that it is copy protected. The various technical faults caused by the CD's copy protection software resulted in significant public backlash. Among others, a spokesman from Philips stated that "any changes that put a disc outside the CD standard result in a disc that should no longer be described or marketed as a CD" in reference to White Lilies Island, while Julian Midgeley, a spokesman for the Campaign for Digital Rights, stated that "all they are doing is annoying a lot of people who cannot do with it what they want to do, which is just listen to it." The outcry ultimately forced Bertelsmann Music Group to reissue the album on CD with the software removed and offer free replacement discs to affected buyers. A hotline was set up where buyers could order replacement discs starting 19 November 2001.

== Critical reception ==
Professional ratings
Aggregate scores
Source	Rating
Metacritic	54/100
Review scores
Source	Rating
AllMusic	3.5/5 stars
Blender	2/5 stars
Entertainment Weekly	B−
Mojo	3/5 stars
New York Post	3/4 stars
Q	2/5 stars
Rolling Stone	2.5/5 stars
Slant Magazine	3/5 stars
Uncut	2/5 stars
Yahoo! Music UK	8/10

The album met with mixed reviews. At Metacritic it received a score of 54 out of 100. AllMusic editor MacKenzie Wilson called the album a "brilliant pop record — contemporary, yet timeless. White Lilies Island would have suffered without Natalie Imbruglia's perfectionism, and it would have lost sight of the elegance it so perfectly exudes." David Browne from Entertainment Weekly found that the album "continues in the same vein of agreeable pop-radio fodder as "Torn," with an all-new group of distraught romantics and connection seekers singing creamy choruses." Chris Heath from Yahoo! Music UK wrote: "She's certainly on the way to achieving her goal. She chips in a hefty wedge of the lyric sheet to the album in the shape of confessional lovesick outpourings that, despite lapses, bind the gutsy album cohesively giving it sophistication, direction and genuine feeling." Slant Magazine's Sal Cinquemani declared the album "pure pop and with its organic edge and introspective lyrics, it's the best kind."

In her review for Blender, Jayne McCulloch commented that White Lilies Island skips from one song to the next without leaving any great impression or displaying a single sentiment Jessica Simpson would find distressing. If, however, she was trying to remake Jagged Little Pill, it's all gone horribly wrong." Pat Blashill, writing for Rolling Stone, wrote: "Despite its immaculate odes to unhappiness, White Lilies Island itself is ear candy with about as much emotional resonance as Kathie Lee Gifford's latest televised crying jag." The Village Voice critic Emma Pearse found that on White Lilies Island "are hints of a rocker in this too gorgeous girl, a couple of guitar stanzas and drum embraces that may even have required a little face-scrunching, a little tendon tension. In 1997 she did well lying naked on the floor. But White Lilies Island smells cheap, and it will stain her." Writing for PopMatters, Adrien Begrand concluded: "Hopefully White Lilies Island's more inspired moments are a foreshadowing of some more good material to come, something to elevate her above all the clichés she seems so dependent on right now. It's obvious she’s talented enough; let's just hope it doesn’t take her so long next time."

== Commercial performance ==
White Lilies Island experienced a varied commercial performance worldwide. In Australia, it debuted at number three on the ARIA Albums Chart and was certified Gold by the Australian Recording Industry Association (ARIA), despite only modest boosts in sales from subsequent singles. In the UK, the album entered and peaked at the UK Albums Chart at number 15, with first-week sales of 21,000. Following the release of the second single, "Wrong Impression," it re-entered the UK top 30 and went on to sell nearly 200,000 copies. On 28 March 2002, White Lilies Island was awarded a Gold certification by the British Phonographic Industry (BPI) for shipments figures of 100,000 units.

Across Europe, the album peaked at number 21 in Italy and number 23 in Switzerland. In the United States, it debuted at number 35 on the US Billboard 200 with 35,000 copies sold, remaining in the top 200 for seven weeks and eventually reaching total sales of 171,000. representing a significant decline compared to her previous album Left of the Middle (1997), which had sold nearly 2 million copies in the United States by that time. The album peaked at number 37 on the Canadian Albums Chart. Globally, White Lilies Island has sold approximately one million copies.

== Track listing ==
White Lilies Island track listing
No.	Title	Writer(s)	Producer(s)	Length
1.	"That Day"	Natalie Imbruglia; Patrick Leonard	Ian Stanley	4:44
2.	"Beauty on the Fire"	Imbruglia; Gary Clark; Mat Wilder	Clark; Pascal Gabriel	4:21
3.	"Satellite"	Imbruglia; Phil Thornalley	Thornalley	3:08
4.	"Do You Love?"	Imbruglia; Clark	Clark	4:43
5.	"Wrong Impression"	Imbruglia; Clark	Stanley	4:17
6.	"Goodbye"	Imbruglia; Wilder	Stanley	5:01
7.	"Everything Goes"	Imbruglia; Clark	Clark	4:01
8.	"Hurricane"	Imbruglia; Clark	Clark	3:38
9.	"Sunlight"	Imbruglia; Clark	Clark; Stanley	5:01
10.	"Talk in Tongues"	Imbruglia; Thornalley	Clark; Gabriel	3:29
11.	"Butterflies"	Imbruglia; Clark	Clark	4:56
12.	"Come September"	Imbruglia; Clark	Clark	4:10

Target edition – bonus track
No.	Title	Writer(s)	Producer(s)	Length
13.	"Just Another Day"	Imbruglia; Clark	Clark	4:22

Japanese bonus tracks
No.	Title	Writer(s)	Producer(s)	Length
10.	"Shikaiya (for Billy)"	Imbruglia; Clark	Clark; Gabriel	3:41
11.	"Talk in Tongues"	Imbruglia; Thornalley	Clark; Gabriel	3:29
12.	"Butterflies"	Imbruglia; Clark	Clark	4:56
13.	"Come September"	Imbruglia; Clark	Clark	4:10

== Credits ==
- Natalie Imbruglia – vocals
- Ian Tilley – bass guitar
- John Dunne – guitar, programming
- Maz – drums
- David Munday – electric guitar, mellotron, flute
- Rej Rheinallt Ap Gwynedd – bass guitar
- Marc Fox – percussion
- Paul Statham – guitar
- Ian Stanley – keyboards
- Geoff Dugmore – drums
- Phil Thornalley – keyboards, bass guitar, acoustic guitar
- Guy Pratt – bass guitar
- Neil Taylor – guitar
- Gary Clark – keyboards, guitar, backing vocals
- Chuck Sabo – drums
- Ged Grimes – bass guitar
- Tessa Niles – backing vocals
- Viveen Wray – backing vocals
- Hannah Robinson – backing vocals

== Charts ==
=== Weekly charts ===
Chart (2001)	Peak position
Australian Albums (ARIA)	3
Austrian Albums (Ö3 Austria)	59
Canadian Albums (Jam!)	37
European Top 100 Albums (Music & Media)	31
French Albums (SNEP)	43
German Albums (Offizielle Top 100)	49
Irish Albums (IRMA)	44
Italian Albums (FIMI)	21
Scottish Albums (Official Charts)	17
Swiss Albums (Schweizer Hitparade)	23
UK Albums (Official Charts)	15
US Billboard 200	35

=== Year-end charts ===
Chart (2002)	Position
Canadian Alternative Albums (Nielsen SoundScan)	148
UK Albums (OCC)	153

== Certifications ==
Region	Certification	Certified units/sales
Australia (ARIA)	Gold	35,000^{^}
United Kingdom (BPI)	Gold	100,000^{^}
United States	—	171,000
Summaries
Worldwide	—	1,000,000
^{^} Shipments figures based on certification alone.
