= Auctionata =

Defunct online luxury auction company

Auctionata AG
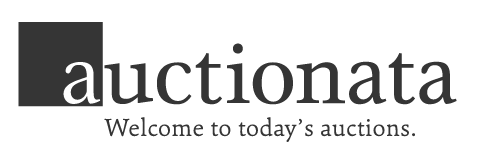
- Type: AG
- Industry: Online auction
- Founded: 2012
- Founder: Alexander Zacke, Susanne Zacke
- Defunct: 2017
- Headquarters: Berlin, Germany
- Area served: Global
- Key people: Thomas Hesse (CEO), Alexander Gilkes (CIO), Lucas Hulsmann (CFO), Osman Khan, Jan Thiel, Johannes Riedl,
- Products: Livestream Auctions, Online shopping, Online auction
- Services: Art valuation
- Revenue: $150 million (2015)
- Number of employees: approx. 120 (as of June 2013 excl. experts)
- Website: auctionata.com

Auctionata was an online auction house and eCommerce company specializing in luxury goods, art, antiques and collectibles based in Berlin with offices in New York. Auctionata had a team of 250 art experts who worked on commission and were not directly employed by Auctionata. These experts were paid by the minute via PayPal for valuing, authenticating, and curating objects including art, cars, watches, antiques. Since opening in February 2012, Auctionata had evaluated and verified over 21,000 pieces of art. Notably, Auctionata's experts discovered a watercolor by Egon Schiele, which was valued at a starting price of $1.3 million (€1 million). Auctionata was declared insolvent on February 29, 2017 by announcing it had ceased operations.

== History ==
Auctionata was founded in 2012 by Alexander Zacke, Susanne Zacke and Georg Untersalmberger with investment capital provided by the Holtzbrinck Publishing Group and the Otto GmbH Group. The online shop was launched in September 2012, and Auctionata's first auction was held in December 2012.

On 22 May 2013, Auctionata announced a strategic partnership with Chrono24, a large specialty marketplace for luxury watches. This partnership included 52 auctions over several years.

In February 2013, Auctionata raised $20.2 million of funding through investment firms Earlybird Venture Capital, E.ventures, Bright Capital, Edward Shenderovich of Kite Ventures, as well as with previous funders Holtzbrinck, Otto and the Raffay Group.

In March 2015, Auctionata raised €42 million ($45 million) from a group of investors led by Bernard Arnault, the Polish private equity fund MCI Management SA and the Hearst Media Corporation.

According to media reports, Auctionata could not pay its employees in December 2016 after expected financing had not arrived. Auctionata filed for preliminary insolvency on 16 January 2017 and had to let go over 70 employees. Following the conclusion of its preliminary insolvency proceedings on 28 February 2017, Auctionata had ceased its German operations. The subsidiaries Paddle8 in the US and Value-my-Stuff in the UK were subsequently sold and continued to operate. Auctionata is included in a list of the top 189 startup failures.

== Technology of live stream auctions ==
Prior to every auction, Auctionata provided information for all items to be auctioned on its website. The auctions themselves were held in a TV-studio and streamed live on the internet using a content delivery network. The auctions were led by a licensed auctioneer and bids are accepted by phone, online, by absentee bid, as well as from the studio floor. Auctionata used a system developed by its founders, Zacke and Untersalmberger, allowing it to transmit the live video stream from the auction using a Real-time operating system without delays. According to the founder, Alexander Zacke, the technology of live auctions primarily was developed to compete with multinational auction houses, including Christie's and Sotheby's. Since potential bidders no longer have to physically attend the auctions, Auctionata's online auctions have been criticized for not promoting the same aura as may be found in traditional auction houses.

== Notable auctions ==
In December 2012, Auctionata auctioned the painting "Roses II", which is attributed to Oskar Kokoschka. Though the painting had been sold to the Bremen tobacco entrepreneur Wolfgang Ritter for 80,000 deutschmarks in 1966 (approx. €151,469 / $204,679 taking into account inflation), and Kokoschka himself wrote a handwritten note of authenticity for the painting, the painting's authenticity was later being questioned by the Oskar Kokoschka Foundation. Auctionata published the Foundation's critique immediately upon receiving it and the painting eventually sold for only $9,975 (€7,500).

Auctionata also auctioned a newly discovered watercolor, "Reclining Woman" by Egon Schiele. The painting was sold for $2.4 million (€1,827,250), the highest grossing piece of fine art sold at an online auction.

=== Online auction world record ===
On June 23, 2015, Auctionata sold a rare enamel, ivory-mounted, and paste-set musical and automaton clock from the late 18th century for 3.37 million euros ($3,8 million) to the Shanghai-based billionaire and art collector Liu Yiqian. A new online auction record was achieved in August 2020 when RM Sothebys sold A Ferrari 550 GT1 Prodrive which achieved $4.29 million.

== Notable mergers and acquisitions ==
On September 25, 2015, Auctionata bought the London-based valuation website Valuemystuff.com, founded by Patrick van der Vorst, one of the largest online valuation companies in the world with over 469,000 valuations and 400,000 customers (stats as of November 2017).

On May 12, 2016, Auctionata and Paddle8 announced that they will merge. The merged company had a turnover of more than $150 million.

== Awards ==
At the 2012 Digital Life Design conference Auctionata was awarded the Digital Star Award as one of the most promising German internet start-ups.

== See also ==
- DoneDeal
