= Paddle8 =

Online auction house

Paddle8 was an online auction house based in New York City selling fine art including post-war and contemporary art, prints and multiples, photography, street art and collectibles. Paddle8's sales focus on pieces priced between $1,000 and $100,000, all vetted by specialists for authenticity. Paddle8 had offices in New York, Los Angeles, London and Hong Kong. In 2016, Paddle8 merged with the Berlin online auction house Auctionata. In February 2017, Auctionata declared insolvency and Paddle8 became an independent company once again, before selling to Native in 2018, and then to Facebank AG in 2019. In March 2020, Paddle8 filed for Chapter 11 bankruptcy protection in New York just one week after the non-profit New American Cinema Group filed a lawsuit against the company for allegedly misappropriating funds from a charity auction.

== History ==
Paddle8 was founded in May 2011 by Alexander Gilkes (a former LVMH executive and the chief auctioneer at Phillips auction house), Aditya Julka (an entrepreneur and Harvard Business School Baker Scholar), and Osman Khan (a banker with experience at Goldman Sachs and Perella Weinberg Partners and a Harvard Business School MBA).

Initially created as a broad platform for presenting exhibitions of contemporary art online, Paddle8 refined its business model to focus solely on auctions. Paddle8 connects buyers and sellers of fine art, collectibles, design, jewelry, and watches through an online auction platform and an iPhone app. In 2014, Paddle8 sold more than $35.8 million worth of art, a 146% gain over the previous year.

Since its founding, Paddle8 partnered with over 300 non-profit organizations worldwide, from the Los Angeles County Museum of Art to the Brooklyn Academy of Music and the Guggenheim, to present their benefit auctions online, dramatically expanding their audience of supporters by tapping into Paddle8's community of 500,000 collectors. By January 2015, Paddle8 had presented more than 500 benefit auctions, with over $500m in bids.

In 2012, Paddle8 acquired online auction platform Blacklots. In May 2013, Paddle8 acquired an option to purchase a stake in Artnet.

In December 2017 P8H Inc, the New York legal entity that owns and operates Paddle8, had been taken over by a syndicate of Swiss investors that installed Izabela Depczyk as the interim CEO and the change manager at Paddle8 with the mandate to introduce and execute on the new business strategy for Paddle8.

In the first 10 months of 2018, Paddle8 realized a 21 percent growth compared to 2017. By summer 2019, under Ms. Depczyk's leadership, Paddle8 ventured into new business areas, like gaming, and the company joined forces with new-media platform Highsnobiety for online sales of curated street art, artist's collectibles, and street wear.

In August 2019 Pulse Evolution Group Inc, the US-listed company, acquired Facebank AG of Switzerland, subsequently renaming itself into Facebank Group Inc and becoming the largest shareholder of P8H Inc (Paddle8) through its holding of Facebank AG. In November P8H Inc appointed the new CEO Valentine Uhovski. In March 2020, the board of Paddle8 filed for Chapter 11 in the Southern District of New York, on the heels of a recent lawsuit demanding payment for works of art sold. Paddle8 submitted a petition with various creditors listed, including Justin Bieber and his wife Hailey, to which they owe just over $73,000, and the Susan und Michael Hort's Rema Hort Mann Foundation. Jay-Z´s Shawn Carter Foundation was also listed, and is owed around $65,000 for a charity auction that was also held in November. Other artists whose sales were also included in the auction in November are, among others, Tom Otterness, Kiki Smith, Jim Jarmusch and Jonas Mekas.

== Funding ==
By October 2015, Paddle8 had raised $44 million from leaders from across the art, luxury, media, and tech industries. Paddle8's $4-million Series A round was led by Founder Collective and Mousse Partners.

In June 2013, Paddle8 announced $6 million in funding from new investors, including artist Damien Hirst, Prince Alexander von Fürstenberg, Russian mogul Vladimir Yevtushenkov, Matthew Mellon, and Jay Jopling, owner of White Cube.

In October 2015, Paddle8 announced $34 million in Series C funding. New investors represented an array of notable figures from the worlds of technology, art and luxury, including newest Paddle8 board member David Zwirner, one of the most influential international art dealers; German collector and investor Rolf Sachs; Eric Fellner, co-chairman of Working Title Films; and Edgar Berger, chairman and CEO International of Sony Music Entertainment. The round also saw participation from existing investors including Mousse Partners, Damien Hirst, Jay Jopling of White Cube Gallery; and Stavros Niarchos, a collector and entrepreneur.

== Benefit auctions ==
Paddle8 also partnered with non-profit institutions to host their benefit auctions online, opening up their fundraising prospects to Paddle8's global community of collectors. As of January 2015, Paddle8 raised more than $33 million for non-profit organizations around the world.

== Merger with Auctionata ==
In May 2016, Paddle8 and Berlin-based online auction platform Auctionata announced that they would merge, creating a company with more specialties and broader international reach. In September 2016 the joint company announced the appointment of a new CEO, Thomas Hesse. In February 2017, Auctionata declared insolvency and Paddle8 became an independent company once again, backed by private equity from a multi-family office called Lightyear Collective, which was incorporated in Delaware only in January 2017 and its members were not disclosed, but are known to include Christopher Hsu, the hedge fund manager who runs the Hong Kong-based Kilometre Capital Management. At the same time, Patrick van der Vorst bought back ValueMyStuff out of the insolvency.
