= Amy Hughes (artist) =

British painter

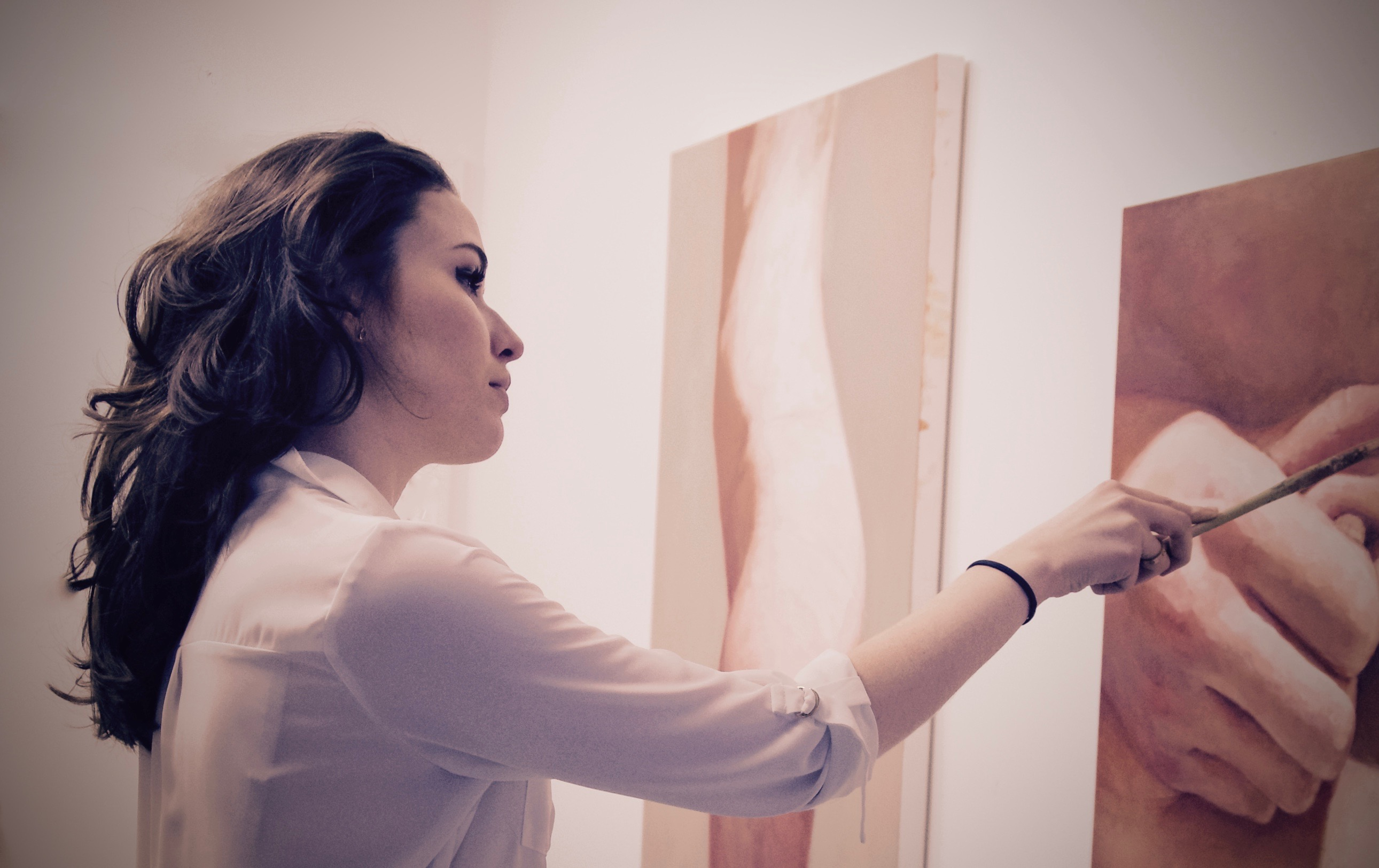
- Hughes studio portrait, 2016
- Born: 1992 (age 33–34); Leicester, Leicestershire, UK
- Education: Liverpool Hope University; New York Academy of Art
- Known for: Conceptual art, contemporary art, painting, realism
- Awards: Prince of Wales Foundation
- Website: amyvhughes.com

Amy Hughes (born 1992), also known as Amy V. Hughes, is a British-born New York City-based contemporary painter. She is best known for the portrait painting of her late grandfather and for her feminist take on the relationships between body and mind.

As of 2018, she teaches painting at the New York Academy of Art, a private graduate art school, and works out of her studio in Greenpoint, Brooklyn.

Hughes has been recognised for her efforts towards advancing the status of women artists and promoting equality.

== Early life and education ==
Hughes was born in Leicester and raised in Cheshire, United Kingdom, and Moscow, Russia. At a young age her artistic abilities were identified and nurtured by her professors. At the age of sixteen, Hughes won the Cransley School Award for Art.

Hughes studied at Sir John Deane's College, followed by Liverpool Hope University where she earned a Bachelor's Degree in Fine Art. At her graduate show in 2013, she was awarded the "Purchase Prize Award"; her painting, "Untitled, 2012", was purchased by the Liverpool Women's Hospital for their permanent collection. The painting currently hangs in the hospital's main atrium.

In 2014, Hughes completed an artist residency at Sir John Deane's College, where a painting of hers remains in private collection. Later that year she relocated to New York City to study for a Master of Fine Arts at the New York Academy of Art. Hughes graduated from the academy in 2016, her studies supported by awards including a New York Academy of Art Merit Scholarship and HRH Prince of Wales Award.

== Exhibitions ==
Hughes's work has been exhibited in many solo and group shows internationally. Her work has been exhibited at Paul Anavian Gallery at the Manhattan Arts & Antiques Center, and the International Portrait Biennial at Wausau Museum of Contemporary Art. She has exhibited and sold work twice at Sotheby's "Take Home a Nude" art auction, alongside pieces by Eric Fischl, Yoko Ono, Kiki Smith, and Judy Chicago.

In 2016, Hughes created a painting for the Westminster Kennel Club which was exhibited at the Annual Dog Show at Madison Square Gardens and printed on the show tickets.

Since 2018, she has had a drawing in the collection of fashion designer Misha Nonoo.

== Awards ==
Year	Award	Category	Result
2019	Feminist Art Residency, Florence, Italy	2020 Artist Residency	Selected
2019	Manhattan Arts International: "HerStory"	Nancy Reyner: Special Recognition Award	Won
2019	Manhattan Arts International: "HerStory"	Woman Artist Advocate Achievement [Monetary] Award	Won
2019	Manhattan Arts International: "HerStory"	Featured Artist Award: Discipline: Painting	Won
2019	International Biennial Portrait Competition	People's Choice Award	Nominated
2018	First Prize: "Up Close" Competition and Exhibition, Artrepreneur	Discipline: Painting	Won
2017	National Oil and Acrylic Painters Society International	Discipline: Oil Painting	Selected
2017	Westminster Kennel Club Painting Competition	Selected Finalists	Selected
2015	HRH Prince of Wales Award	Scholarship	Won
2014	New York Academy of Art	Merit Scholarship	Won
2013	Liverpool Women's Hospital	Purchase Prize	Won
2008	Cransley School Outstanding Student	Fine Art	Won
