= Salman Al-Azami =

British-Bangladeshi author

- Education: Aligarh Muslim University
- Occupations: Author and academic at Liverpool Hope University
- Website: https://salmanalazami.com

Salman Al-Azami is a British-Bangladeshi author and academic at Liverpool Hope University, where he is a senior lecturer in English language.

== Early life ==
He is the son of Prof Ghulam Azam, the former leader of Bangladesh Jamaat-e-Islami. Al-Azami obtained his BA, MA, and PhD at Aligarh Muslim University in India.

== Publications ==
Dr Al-Azami is the author a number of works including Religion in the Media: A Linguistic Analysis, published by Palgrave Macmillan.

He frequently publishes articles on matters pertaining to religion, media, and his native Bangladesh, in a variety of online media outlets including The Huffington Post, OpenDemocracy and Anadolu Agency. He has also published several academic articles.
