= ACS International Schools =

Location
- Cobham, Surrey; Egham, Surrey; Hillingdon, Greater London; England; 51.347°N 0.401°W

Information
- School type: Private Pre-school–12th grade
- Established: 1967
- Founder: Gordon E Speed and Emmanuel J Poularas
- Chairman: Robert Macnaughton
- Gender: Co-educational
- Age: 2 to 18
- Enrollment: 2400
- Average class size: 201
- Education system: IB
- Campus: Three locations: Cobham, Egham, Hillingdon
- Mascot: Cobham: Cougars, Egham: Jaguars, Hillingdon: Hawks
- Accreditation: The New England Association of Schools and Colleges
- Tuition: £7,910-£27,650 (per annum)
- Website: acs-schools.com

ACS International Schools, known as American Community Schools until 2005, is a group of international schools operating three schools near the edge of Greater London, with campuses in Cobham and Egham in Surrey, and Hillingdon. Its head office is on Portsmouth Road, Cobham.

ACS Egham International School is a co-educational international day school in Egham, Surrey, England. Located near the Savill Garden in Windsor Great Park, approximately 25 miles (40 km) from central London, the school educates students from age 3 to 18 and represents more than 50 nationalities.

ACS Cobham International School is an international day and boarding school in Cobham, Surrey, England. Situated on a 128-acre campus, the school educates around 1,300 students aged 2 to 18, representing more than 70 nationalities.

ACS Hillingdon International School is a coeducational international day school in Hillingdon, London. Based at Hillingdon Court.

== Notable alumni ==
- Misha Nonoo (2003), fashion designer
- Dave Weigel (2001), writer
