= Atulya Nagar =

Atulya K. Nagar
- Occupations: Mathematical physicist, academic and author
- Spouse: Jyoti Nagar

Academic background
- Education: BSc., Mathematics and Physics; MSc., Mathematics; MPhil., Relativistic Cosmology; DPhil., Mathematics
- Alma mater: University of Ajmer; University of York

Atulya K. Nagar is a mathematical physicist, academic and author. He holds the Foundation Chair as Professor of Mathematics and is the Pro-Vice-Chancellor for Research at Liverpool Hope University.

Nagar's research spans nonlinear mathematical analysis, theoretical computer science, and systems engineering, and addressing complex problems across scientific, engineering, and industrial domains with mathematical and computational methods. His publications include over 550 research articles and eleven books including A Nature-Inspired Approach to Cryptology, Digital Resilience: Navigating Disruption and Safeguarding Data Privacy, Sine Cosine Algorithm for Optimization and the Handbook of Research on Soft Computing and Nature-Inspired Algorithms. He received the Commonwealth Fellowship Award, along with multiple Best Paper Awards.

Nagar is a Fellow of the Institute of Mathematics and its Applications and the Higher Education Academy. Among his editorial service, he served as the Editor-in-Chief of the International Journal of Artificial Intelligence and Soft Computing (IJAISC), and co-edits two-book series: Algorithms for Intelligent Systems (AIS) and Innovations in Sustainable Technologies and Computing (ISTC).

Nagar holds an Erdős number of 3, indicating close academic proximity to the renowned mathematician Paul Erdős, established through collaborations.

== Education and early career ==
Nagar earned a BSc Honors in Mathematics and Physics in 1988, an MSc in Pure and Applied Mathematics in 1990, and an MPhil in Relativistic Cosmology in 1992, all from the MDS University of Ajmer (Government College Ajmer (GCA)) in India. In 1991, he was appointed Research Fellow at the Indian Institute of Technology. He was awarded the Commonwealth Fellowship in 1993 to pursue his doctoral studies, and he received a DPhil in Mathematics from the University of York in 1996, where he concurrently served as a Research Associate. His DPhil advisor was Arnold M. Arthurs.

== Career ==
Nagar worked at Brunel University, London, within the Departments of Mathematical Sciences and Systems Engineering. In 2001, he joined Liverpool Hope University, initially as a Lecturer, later appointed associate professor, and has served as full Professor since 2008.

Nagar led the establishment of the School of Mathematics, Computer Science and Engineering, and later founded the Faculty of Science, serving as the inaugural Dean and overseeing the development of STEM disciplines. Subsequently, in 2019, he was appointed Pro-Vice-Chancellor for Research.

Through his engagement in strategic research bodies in the UK, Nagar has contributed to various panels and taken on advisory roles, including with the JISC Research Strategy Group, UK Research and Innovation (UKRI)’s Talent Panel College (TPC), and the Commonwealth Scholarship Commission (CSC).

== Research ==
Nagar contributed to the field of mathematical physics and computational sciences by studying modeling and optimization, relativistic cosmology and differential forms, non-linear differential equations, solutions of nonlinear boundary value problems, theoretical computer science, picture grammar, membrane computing or P-systems, neural networks, computational intelligence, electroencephalography, evolutionary computation, natural computing, fuzzy control systems, computer simulation, differential evolution, fuzzy sets, control systems theory, hemodynamics, image analysis, particle swarm optimization, and artificial intelligence.

As a Hindu priest (Purohit or Brahmin), he is knowledgeable in Sanskrit and has explored mathematical modeling within Vedic literature. He has also authored articles in English, Hindi, and Sanskrit on these topics.

== Works ==
Nagar has published books on computing and algorithms. His first book, the Handbook of Research on Emerging Technologies for Electrical Power Planning, Analysis, and Optimization explored emergent methods and research to optimize electrical systems' function, addressing the increasing demand for efficient energy sources globally. In the subsequent edition, Handbook of Research on Soft Computing and Nature-Inspired Algorithms, he examined the intersection of soft computing and nature-inspired computing, showing applications across swarm intelligence, speech recognition, and electromagnetic problem-solving. He also co-edited three books in the Innovations in Communication and Computing series; Advances in Nature-Inspired Computing and Applications, Advances in Cyber Security Analytics and Decision Systems and Advances in Nature-Inspired Cyber Security and Resilience.

Working alongside Jagdish C. Bansal, Prathu Bajpai and Anjali Rawat, Nagar published Sine Cosine Algorithm for Optimization, looking into the sine cosine algorithm (SCA), its principles, applications, and a MATLAB code for the basic SCA. He further analyzed nature-inspired algorithms and their applications in modern cryptography, with approaches to enhance security in A Nature-Inspired Approach to Cryptology, which he co-authored with Shishir Kumar Shandilya and Agni Datta. In 2024, he co-wrote Digital Resilience: Navigating Disruption and Safeguarding Data Privacy with Shandilya, Datta and Yash Kartik, detailing techniques like quantum computing and zero-trust systems to counter digital threats, and assessing AI's role in cybersecurity and significant cyber incidents.

=== Complementary bivariational principles ===
Nagar, as a co-author, contributed to the development of a new method for solving nonlinear boundary value problems using complementary bivariational principles. This approach focuses on methods for integral equations to derive pointwise bounds for solutions. By reformulating differential equation problems into Hammerstein-type integral equations, his research applied bivariational techniques to provide complementary pointwise bounds for the solution functions. He showed that the method was effective for nonlinear problems in mathematical physics, chemical kinetics, and biological systems. His work also demonstrated enhanced accuracy in solutions compared to previous methods.

=== Control systems and uncertainty modelling ===
Nagar developed an approach using linear fractional transformations (LFT) and semi-definite programming (SDP) to analyze uncertainty in state estimation for water distribution systems. His method transformed the LFT problem into an SDP problem to obtain ellipsoid-of-confidence bounds. He applied it to a twelve-node water distribution network, showing that the technique improved accuracy in managing uncertainties in system state estimations, demonstrating its effectiveness through simulations using MATLAB.

=== Theoretical computer science and membrane computing ===
Nagar, in collaboration with K.G. Subramanian and colleagues, made contributions to theoretical computer science and membrane computing. Their work includes developing Pure 2D Eilenberg P systems and exploring array P systems based on 2D context-free grammars. They also investigated Parikh matrices and their applications in generating picture arrays using flat splicing operations.

=== Computational optimization ===
Nagar's work on computational optimization has involved the development of enhanced algorithms. In a highly cited study, he introduced the Rat Swarm Optimizer (RSO), a bio-inspired algorithm modeled on rat behaviors, demonstrating its effectiveness through benchmarking, comparisons with eight algorithms, and testing on real-life engineering problems. He also proposed MOSOA, an extension of SOA for multi-objective problems, validated against existing algorithms. Additionally, he compared differential evolution (DE), particle swarm optimization (PSO), and a hybrid algorithm (HPSDE) for optimizing hydrocarbon reservoir well placement, showing the hybrid approach's superior performance in maximizing recovery and addressing geological uncertainty.

In a paper published in IEEE Transactions on Systems, Man, and Cybernetics: Systems, Nagar demonstrated an adaptive memetic algorithm (AMA) combining differential evolution (DE) and Q-learning for optimization, outperforming traditional algorithms in simulations and real-world path-planning tasks.

=== Machine learning ===
Nagar studied artificial intelligence and machine learning by devising techniques to improve reinforcement learning. He presented a deterministic Q-learning algorithm that uses distance knowledge for efficient Q-table updates, reducing time complexity and storage needs, and shows superior performance in mobile robot path planning compared to classical and extended Q-learning. In addition, he showcased a robotic system that learns and mimics an experienced player's actions in a simple indoor game using reinforcement learning, achieving high success rates in training younger children.

=== Fuzzy control systems ===
Nagar utilized fuzzy sets and control systems to enhance various cognitive processes, including load detection, emotion recognition, and dopamine prediction. In a paper that received the Best Paper Award at the IEEE International Conference on Fuzzy Systems, he presented a method for detecting cognitive load levels during symbol-meaning associative learning tasks using fNIRs data and a type-2 fuzzy classifier, achieving over 89% accuracy. He also addressed uncertainty in emotion recognition using type-2 fuzzy sets, constructing a fuzzy face space from facial features and achieving 98.333% classification accuracy.

Collaborating with Madhuleena Dasgupta and Amit Konar, Nagar proposed a novel online prediction method for adult dopamine concentration levels using Type-2 fuzzy rules and EEG data, with potential applications in enhancing concentration and aiding brain disease treatment. Furthermore, he utilized EEG signals to detect cognitive failures in driving, employing specialized fuzzy neural classifiers and support vector machines for enhanced driver safety.

== Awards and honors ==
- 1993 – Commonwealth Fellowship Award, University of York
- 2017 – Best Paper Award, IEEE International Conference on Fuzzy Systems

== Bibliography ==
=== Selected books ===
- Handbook of Research on Emerging Technologies for Electrical Power Planning, Analysis, and Optimization (2016) ISBN 978-1-4666-9911-3
- Advances in Nature-Inspired Cyber Security and Resilience (2022) ISBN 978-3-030-90707-5
- Sine Cosine Algorithm for Optimization (2023) ISBN 978-981-19-9721-1
- A Nature-Inspired Approach to Cryptology (2023) ISBN 978-981-99-7081-0
- Digital Resilience: Navigating Disruption and Safeguarding Data Privacy (2024) ISBN 978-3-031-53289-4

=== Selected articles ===
- Konar, A., Chakraborty, I. G., Singh, S. J., Jain, L. C., & Nagar, A. K. (2013). A deterministic improved Q-learning for path planning of a mobile robot. IEEE Transactions on Systems, Man, and Cybernetics: Systems, 43(5), 1141–1153.
- Nwankwor, E., Nagar, A. K., & Reid, D. C. (2013). Hybrid differential evolution and particle swarm optimization for optimal well placement. Computational Geosciences, 17, 249–268.
- Rakshit, P., Konar, A., Bhowmik, P., Goswami, I., Das, S., Jain, L. C., & Nagar, A. K. (2013). Realization of an adaptive memetic algorithm using differential evolution and Q-learning: A case study in multirobot path planning. IEEE Transactions on Systems, Man, and Cybernetics: Systems, 43(4), 814–831.
- Dhiman, G., Garg, M., Nagar, A., Kumar, V., & Dehghani, M. (2021). A novel algorithm for global optimization: rat swarm optimizer. Journal of Ambient Intelligence and Humanized Computing, 12, 8457–8482.
- Dhiman, G., Singh, K. K., Soni, M., Nagar, A., Dehghani, M., Slowik, A., ... & Cengiz, K. (2021). MOSOA: A new multi-objective seagull optimization algorithm. Expert Systems with Applications, 167, 114150.
- Shringi, S., Sharma, H., Narayan Rathie, P., Chand Bansal, J., Nagar, A., & Lal Suthar, D. (2024). Predicting COVID-19 outbreak in India using modified SIRD model. Applied Mathematics in Science and Engineering, 32(1), 2305191.
