= 3, Islington Square =

Historic building in Liverpool, England

Coordinates: 53°24′43.7″N 2°58′5.3″W

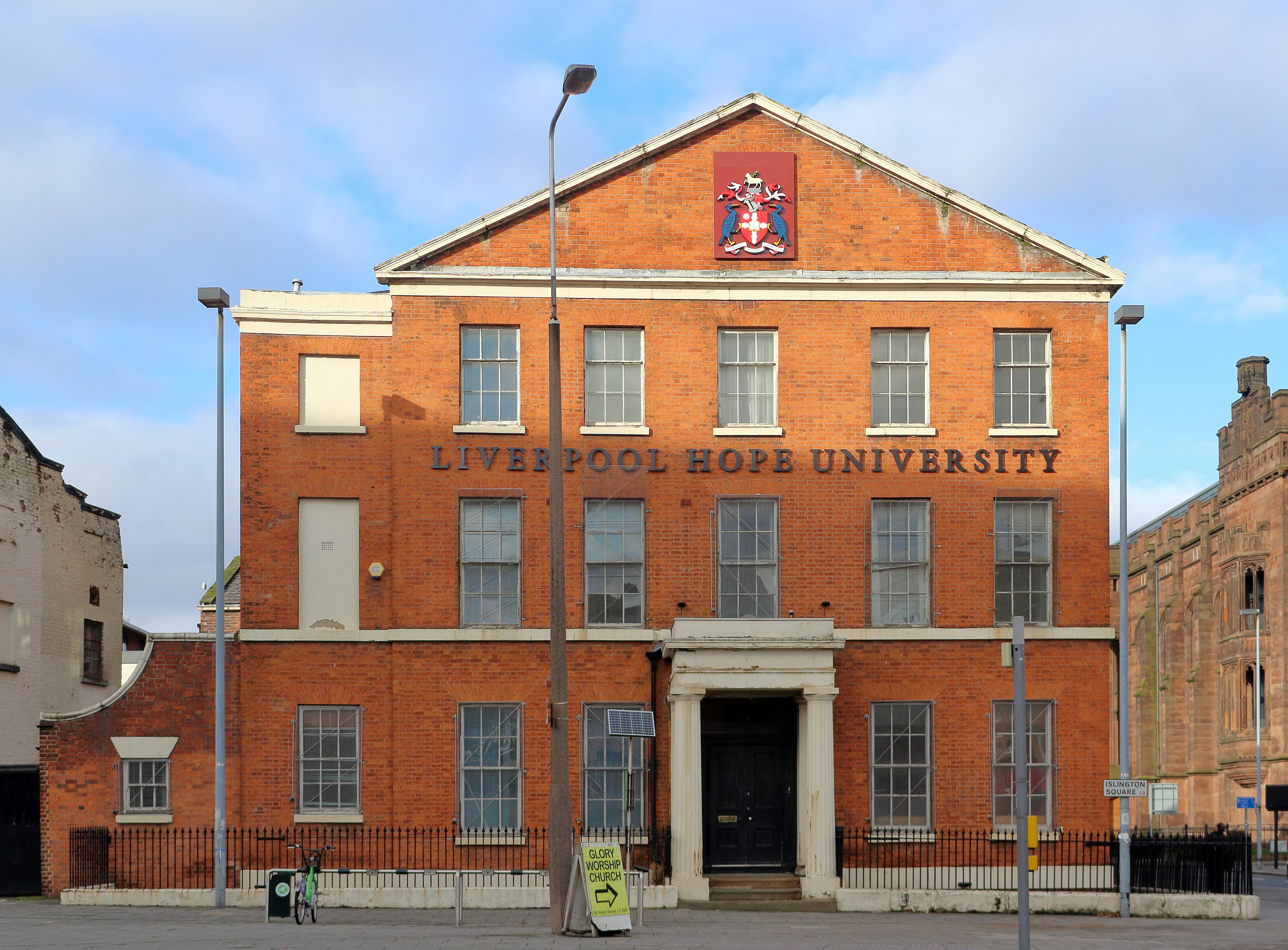

General information
- Type: University building
- Location: Islington Square, Liverpool, England, United Kingdom

3, Islington Square is a university building in Everton, Liverpool that is owned by Liverpool Hope University. It is located on the corner of where Carver Street meets Shaw Street, and forms part of the university's 'Creative Campus'.

== History ==
Originally built as a townhouse in the 1830s, the first known owner was a merchant and financier, Elias Mocatta, who lived at the house between 1839 and 1849. The building was then occupied by a surgeon called William Bainbridge and his family in 1851. Another doctor, Charles Bowman Wilson, lived there with his family from 1861 to 1881. The building was home to Liverpool Society for the Prevention of Cruelty to Children, which used it as a shelter from 1885 until 1944. The building was later used as a health centre before being bought by the University in 2017.

== Architecture ==
Historic England describes the building as "Brick with stone dressings, slate roof 3 storeys with basement." The building has a central Greek Doric portico up three steps and an extension to the left.

== Redevelopment ==
The University submitted an application to Liverpool City Council in November 2022 to convert the usage of the building. It is intended that the building will serve as an education facility, providing the University with an additional 9,074 square feet of teaching space.

== See also ==
- Architecture of Liverpool
