= Liverpool Hope University =

University in Liverpool, England

- Coat of arms
- Other name: LHU
- Motto: Ancient Greek: ὲν πιστει ὲλπιδι και ἀγἀπη
- Motto in English: Hope to all who need it
- Type: Public
- Established: 1844 – Saint Katharine's College (as Warrington Training College); 1856 – Notre Dame College (as Our Lady's Training College); 1964 – Christ's College; 1979 – Liverpool Institute of Higher Education; 1995 – Liverpool Hope University College; 2005 – Liverpool Hope University
- Accreditation: AACSB
- Religious affiliation: Anglican, Catholic
- Chancellor: Monica Grady
- Vice-Chancellor: Penny Haughan
- Students: 5,330 (2024/25)
- Undergraduates: 4,425 (2024/25)
- Postgraduates: 905 (2024/25)
- Doctoral students: 121
- Location: Liverpool, England, United Kingdom; 53.39°N 2.89°W
- Campus: Hope Park, Childwall and Creative Campus, Everton
- Colours: White, Black, Dark red
- Website: www.hope.ac.uk
- Location of Hope Park campus

Liverpool Hope University (abbreviated LHU) is a public university with campuses in Liverpool, England. ‌The university grew out of three teacher training colleges: Saint Katharine's College (originally Warrington Training College), Notre Dame College (originally Our Lady's Training College) and Christ's College. Uniquely in European higher education, the university is ecumenical, with Saint Katharine's College being Anglican and Notre Dame and Christ's Colleges being Catholic. The Anglican Bishop of Liverpool, David Sheppard and the Catholic Archbishop of Liverpool, Derek Worlock (who gave their names to the university's Sheppard-Worlock Library) played a prominent role in its formation. Its name derives from Hope Street, the road that connects the city's Anglican and Catholic cathedrals, where graduation ceremonies are alternately held.

The university is a research and teaching intensive institution. It has gained recognition for its teaching. In 2023, it achieved an overall Silver rating in the UK Government's Teaching Excellence Framework (TEF), and rankings in teaching-focused league tables is comparable with lower-performing Russell Group universities. Former vice chancellor Gerald Pillay summarised the university as a liberal arts college-style environment where "[students are] a name, not a number." Its "small and beautiful" ethos has been contrasted with the larger neighbouring University of Liverpool and Liverpool John Moores University (LJMU).

== History ==
=== The Victorian colleges ===
The university's earliest origins lie in the "Warrington Training College" set up in 1844 under the auspices of the Rector of Warrington Horatio Powys. Powys, who has a lecture theatre named in his honour in the EDEN Building, was the first Secretary of the Board of Education set up by the Diocese of Chester in 1839. The Warrington Training College was the second college set up by the Chester Diocesan Board within the current boundaries of Cheshire; the first having been established in Chester itself in 1839 (similarly the point of origin of the University of Chester). With the Chester college having been designed to train its (male) schoolmasters, the Warrington college was set up as a counterpart to train female teachers for the diocesan elementary schools.

In 1856, the second of the university's predecessor colleges, "Our Lady's Training College", also referred to as "Notre Dame" and "Mount Pleasant", was opened by the Sisters of Notre Dame de Namur. Like Warrington Training College, Notre Dame provided education to women. Researchers have noted that while both colleges educated women, Notre Dame "offered a broad-based education" unlike the "more domestic expectations in the education of women" which prevailed at Warrington Training College.

In 1930, Warrington Training College arrived in Liverpool, moving to the Taggart Avenue site having relocated initially to Battersea in London following a fire that had destroyed the college's original Warrington building in 1923. Its new home was the then-newly constructed building that still stands. Designed by the London-based Scottish architects Slater & Moberly at a cost of £170,000 in partnership with a young Reginald Uren (who handled the construction phase), it is described by Historic England as being laid out "on a grand scale with accomplished Vernacular Revival styling reminiscent of Lutyens' Home Counties architecture" and "[an] impressive main court [that] maximises views over the Rector's Lawn and is complemented by a cloister-like rear quadrangle".

In 1938, the college was renamed "Saint Katharine's Training College", after the patron saint of learning Katharine of Alexandria.

=== A third college and university affiliation ===
In 1930, by coincidence the same year as Saint Katharine's (then Warrington Training College) College arrived in Liverpool, the Victoria University of Manchester (VUM) and the University of Liverpool had set up a Training College Examinations Board covering the teacher training colleges that existed at that point within Lancashire – which at that time included both Merseyside and Greater Manchester – and Cheshire. This followed the blueprint for universities being involved in "Joint Examining Boards" for teacher training, initiated by the Board of Education in 1926 and based on the idea of making the curriculum and organisation of teacher education more in tune with other forms of higher education.

Both Notre Dame (in the guise of Mount Pleasant Training College) and Warrington Training College (now Saint Katharine's College) were on a list of eight such colleges overseen by the VUM/University of Liverpool Examinations Board; among the others were the Diocesan Training College in Chester (the future University of Chester) and the non-denominational Edge Hill Training College in Ormskirk (forerunner of Edge Hill University). Initially two colleges based in Manchester were involved, but over time these withdrew from the scheme and it became exclusively a University of Liverpool venture, with the training colleges defined as the University of Liverpool's Associated Colleges.

In 1964, Saint Katharine's Training College was renamed simply as Saint Katharine's College, and, in the same year, Christ's College was opened to students on the opposite side of Taggart Avenue. Christ's had been founded by the Catholic Education Service and upon its creation enrolled like Saint Katharine's and Notre Dame as one of the University of Liverpool's Associated Colleges. Unlike Notre Dame, it admitted male students and was the first Catholic co-educational teachers' training college in England.

In 1974, the three colleges (along with the other colleges included in the venture) became formally integrated into the University of Liverpool's management structure via its new Board of College Studies. Instead of Associated Colleges, they were now re-designated as Affiliated Colleges. The Board of College Studies had "quasi-faculty status" and was the vehicle for a validation agreement which formalised the ability of the colleges (consented to by the University of Liverpool the previous year) to offer a general BA degree. Students who excelled were allowed to complete their studies to honours level at the University of Liverpool itself, though in practice few students from Saint Katharine's, Notre Dame or Christ's did so.

=== Federation and merger of colleges ===
The 1972 James Report had forecast a future reduction in teacher training intakes due to an oversupply of trained teachers in the context of the post-baby boom decline in the UK's birth rate since the mid-1960s. In response, the three colleges set up a joint committee in 1973 to discuss federation, establishing an Interim Federal Academic Council in 1974. The momentum towards federation was increased in the mid-1970s when the two Victorian colleges (along with similar institutions across the UK) were served with notice of imminent closure by the Government. Unlike Saint Katharine's and Notre Dame, Christ's was not earmarked for closure given its more modern provenance and also its success at the time.

As the proposed federation promised to bring together Catholic and Anglican education it was supported by Archbishop Worlock and Bishop Sheppard as "a major plank of their wider ecumenical vision for the city". A visit to London by the two men was instrumental to the granting of permission from the education minister, who reputedly agreed "as an expedient" to placate the two men, believing that the proposed federation would be short-lived.

In 1979, the federation was formally completed, with the three colleges becoming the constituents of a new body: Liverpool Institute of Higher Education (LIHE). The following year the two Catholic colleges merged, continuing on Christ's' Taggart Avenue site as Christ's and Notre Dame College (CND).

During the 1980s, the two colleges Saint Katharine's and CND co-existed under the umbrella of LIHE, with rationalisations gradually taking place to reduce the duplication of functions. However, whilst on an administrative level this was generally accomplished, at the end of the 1980s and into the 1990s there were still two libraries on the combined LIHE campus, as well as two chapels. (It was not until the 2000s that the modernist chapel formerly of Christ's became the only chapel at the Taggart Avenue site, with the Saint Katharine's chapel converted into a senate chamber.) Student social life was also largely carried on separately in the two colleges.

In 1990, the colleges merged and LIHE became a single institution as opposed to a federation of two colleges. The colleges therefore finally ceased to exist as academic entities.

=== Greater independence and a new name ===
The 1988 Teaching and Higher Education Act had imposed a new accountability framework which made the "tutelage relationship" with the University of Liverpool more inconvenient for LIHE in the early 1990s. In response to the 1988 Act, the validation agreement which operated through the Board of College Studies was tightened. University of Liverpool staff were now required to be present at LIHE subject management meetings and to be consulted over any proposed academic changes, however small.

In 1994, these constraints resulted in the replacement of the validation agreement with an accreditation agreement from the University of Liverpool which gave LIHE autonomy to validate undergraduate degrees on its own. With the change also applying to the former Diocesan Training College in Chester (by that point renamed as Chester College of Higher Education and the only other remaining Affiliated College), the University of Liverpool's College Studies Unit was disbanded the same year.

In 1995, it was decided to rename LIHE, which formally assumed the name Liverpool Hope University College (shortened to "Liverpool Hope" or simply "Hope"). The name-change represented an attempt to establish a more striking, characterful identity that reflected the original religious purpose of the three founding colleges. Reflecting upon the renaming in 2003, Elford asserted that "Hope is now arguably one of the most mission-explicit Christian institutions in British higher education".

The Taggart Avenue site was accordingly renamed Hope Park, with the site of the former St Francis Xavier's School site in Everton (the school itself having moved to Woolton in the 1960s) being purchased and developed as the Creative Campus in 1999.

=== The present-day university ===
Hope achieved taught degree awarding powers in 2002, and three years later was awarded university status, becoming Liverpool Hope University. Research degree awarding powers and full independence followed in 2009.

== Campuses ==
The university has two teaching campuses. The larger of these is Hope Park in Childwall and hosts the Liverpool Hope Business School, the School of Law and Criminology, the School of Humanities, the School of Education, the School of Social Sciences, the School of Health and Sport Sciences, the School of Computer Science and the Environment and the School of Psychology. The second campus, Creative Campus, is located in Everton and is home to the School of Creative and Performing Arts.

The university has a residential campus, Aigburth Park, in St Michael's, approximately 3 mi (4.8 km) from Liverpool's city centre and Hope Park.

The university also has an outdoor education centre in Snowdonia, North Wales, Plas Caerdeon.

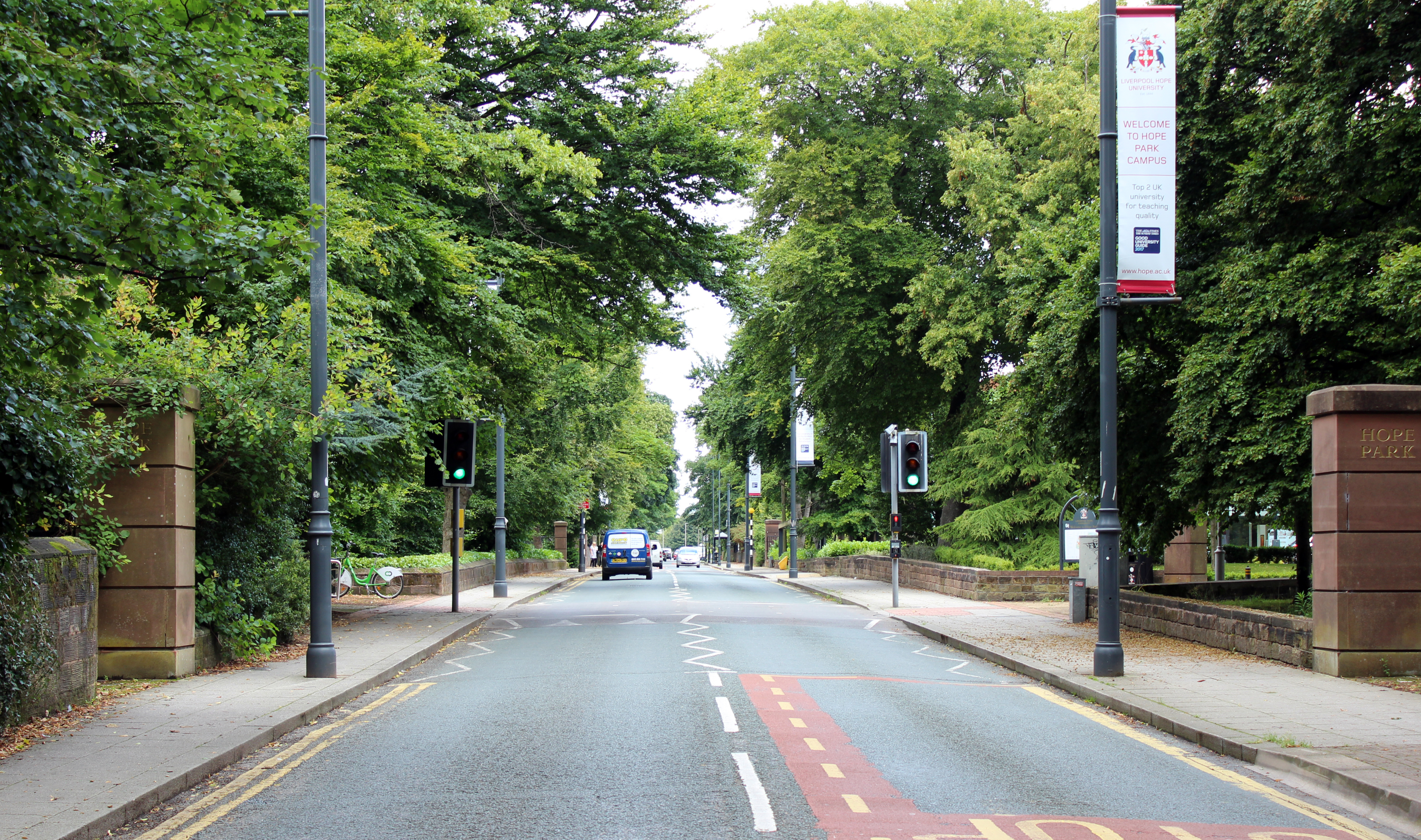
Looking northwards along Taggart Avenue

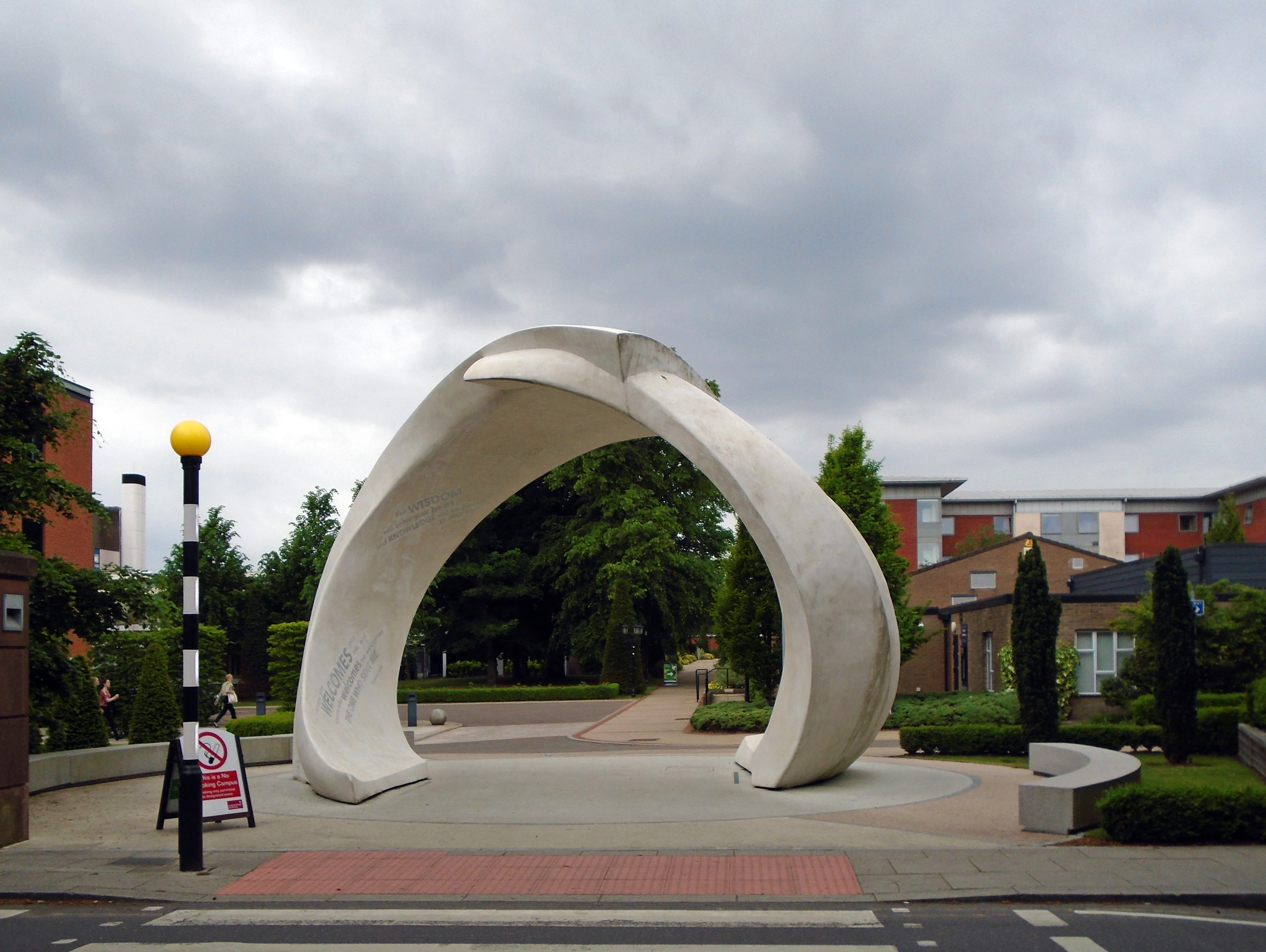
Sculpture at the main entrance to the western side of the campus

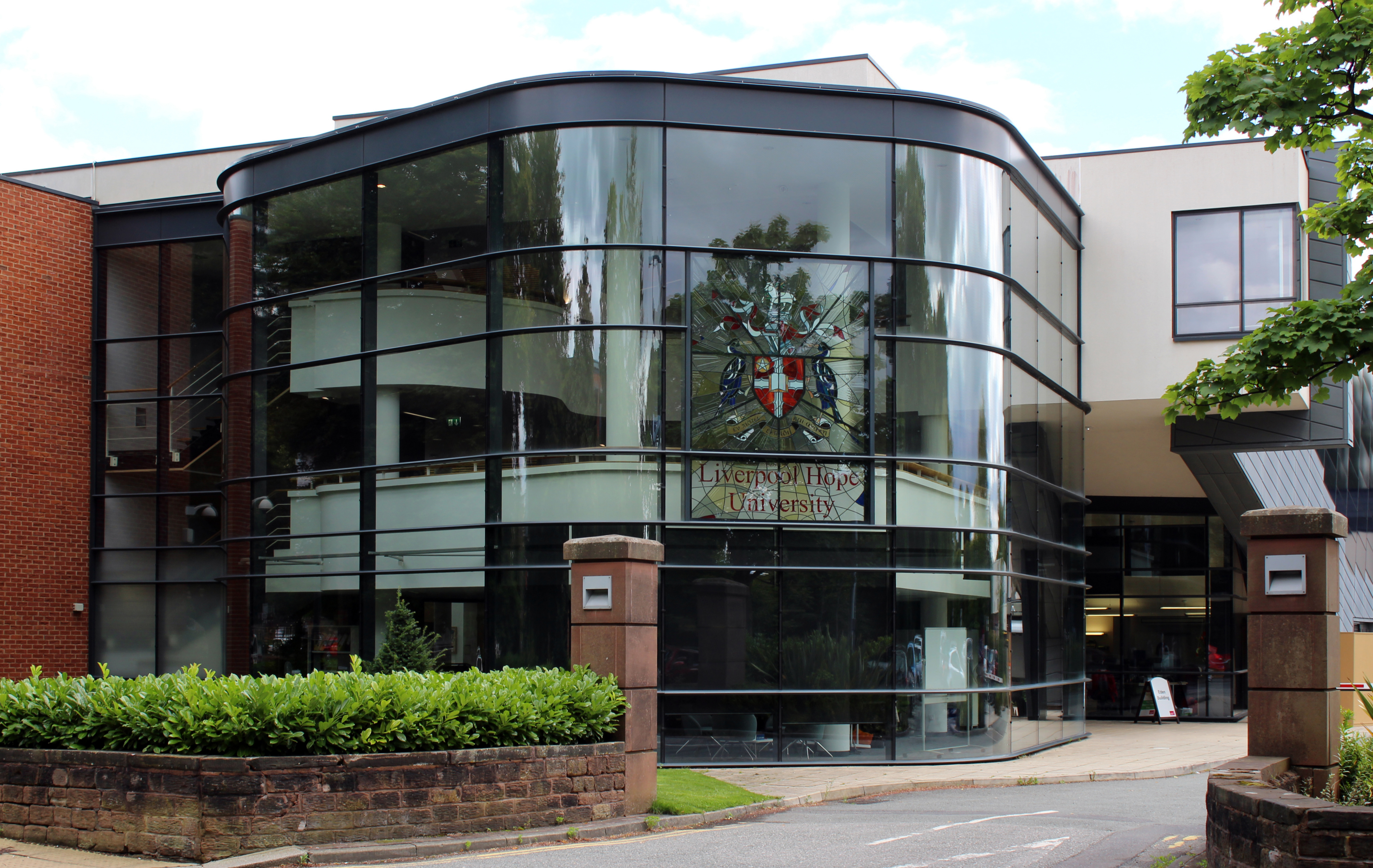
Education & Enterprise (EDEN) Building

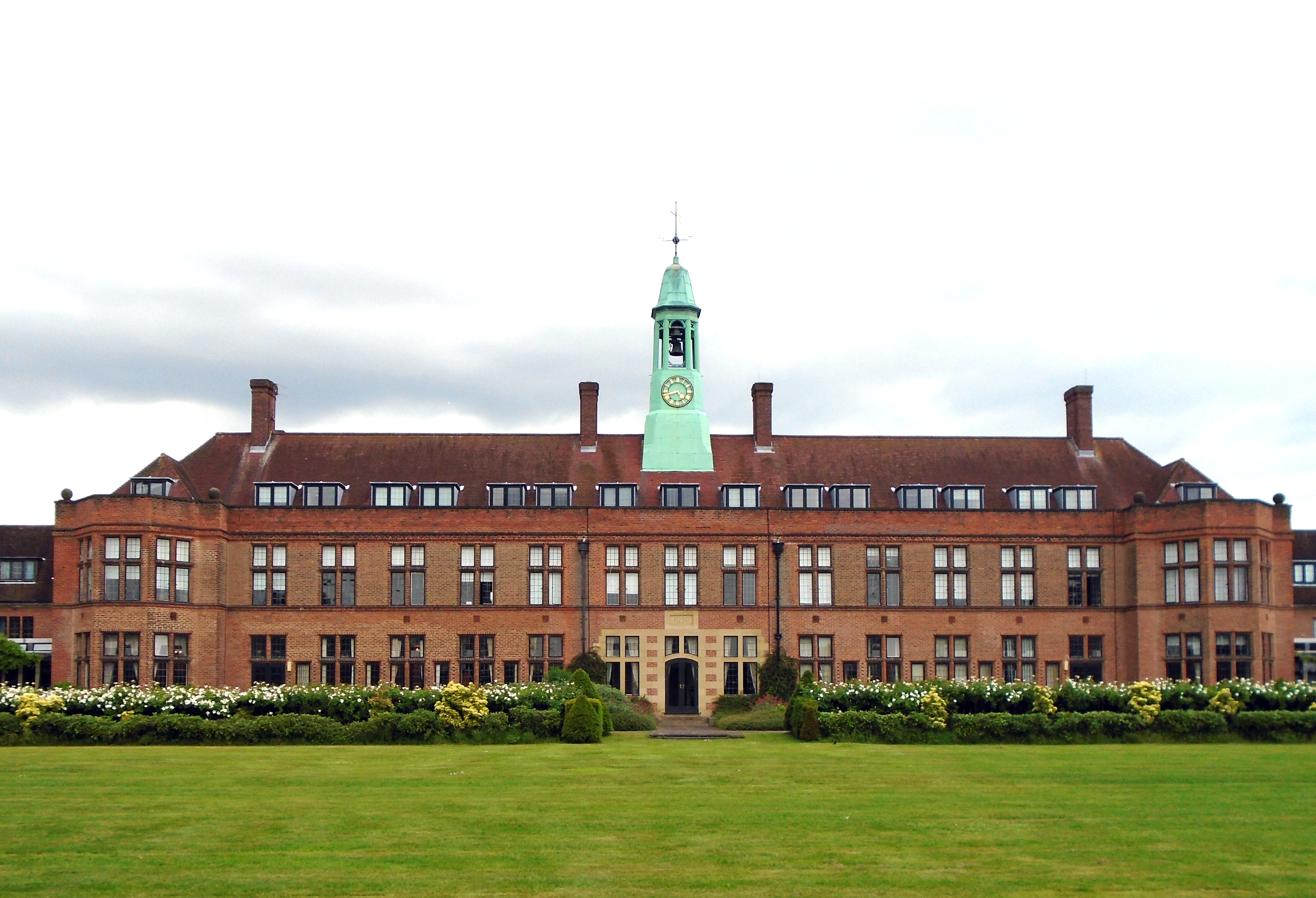
Hilda Constance Allen Building, formerly Saint Katharine's College

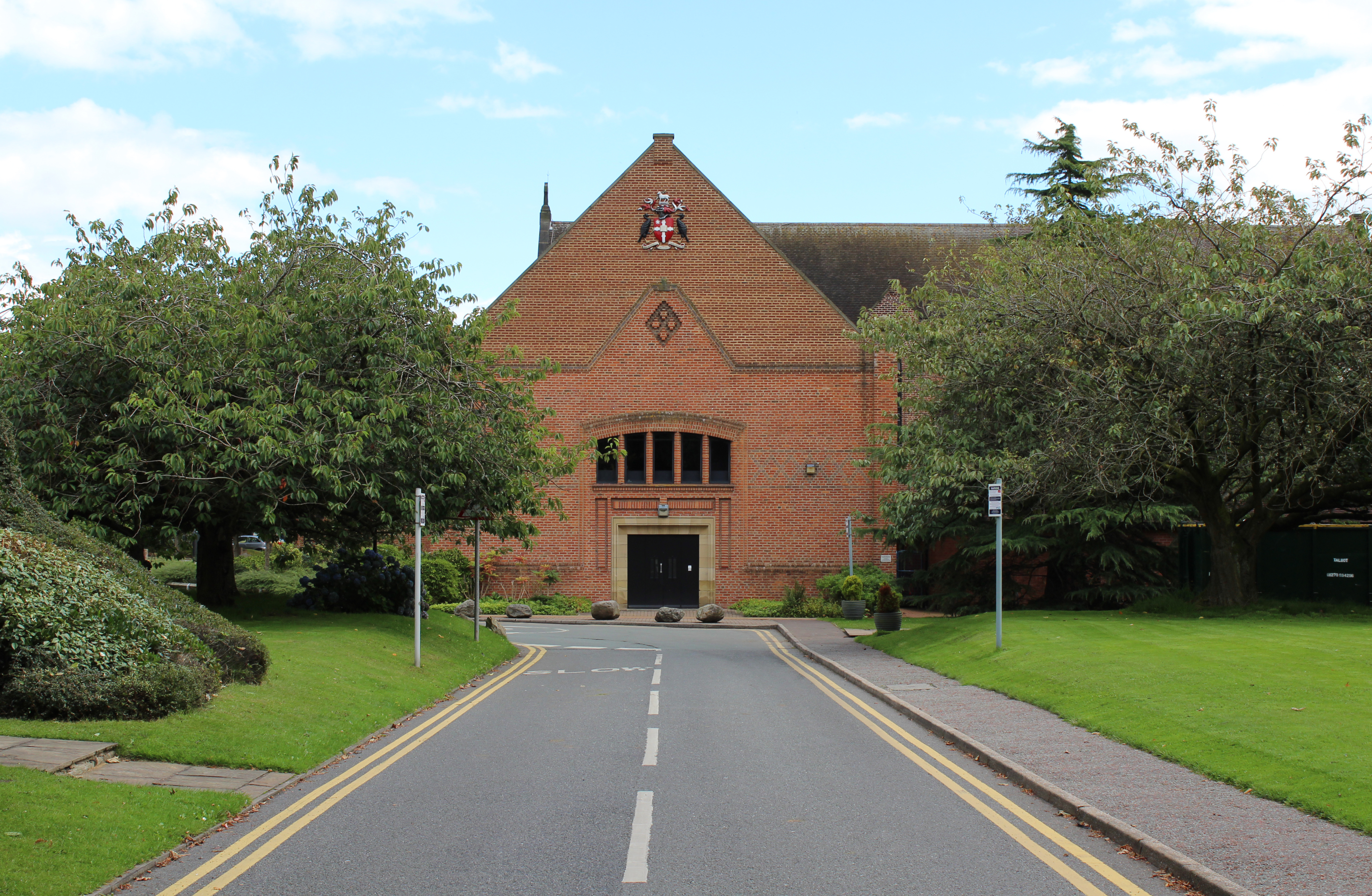
Sheppard-Worlock Library

=== Sheppard-Worlock Library ===
The Sheppard-Worlock Library is the university's main library. Located at Hope Park (there is also a small library at the Creative Campus), it is blended in to the Hilda Constance Allen Building, extending upwards an original low-rise block running east–west between two wings at the building's northern end. Previously the space had been occupied partly by kitchen and dining facilities.

The library was constructed in 1997 at the cost of £5.34m. A £1.5m refurbishment in 2012 included the creation of a British Standard vault for its special collections.

=== Special collections ===
Name	Description
Gradwell Collection	Entrusted to the university upon the closure of St Joseph's College at Up Holland in 1991. Contains material covering theology, philosophy, church, secular and local history, ecclesiastical history, art, architecture, sociology, education and works of general reference. Also includes recusant works and early printed works.
Picton Collection	Contains many of the classic New Testament works published before 1975, linguistic studies including older Hebrew, Aramaic and Greek lexicons, and several sets of theological texts.
Archbishop Stuart Blanch (1918–1994) Collection	Materials from the estate of Archbishop Blanch. Includes notes from his time as a student at Wycliffe Hall, Oxford and notes for sermons, lectures, talks and speeches made while Bishop of Liverpool (1960–1966) and Archbishop of York (1975–1983).
Library for the Andrew F. Walls Centre for the Study of African and Asian Christianity	Materials donated by Walls himself on the history of missionary activity, principally in Africa and the Asia-Pacific region but also in other parts of the world, and also on mission theology and practice, non-Christian faiths, and the history of religions.
Education Research Collection	Books, pamphlets and journals on education and related subjects donated by the University of Liverpool. Contains 30,000 books and pamphlets, and books on all aspects of education (especially historical) with large sections on special education and religious education. Includes bibliographies, Government and other statistical publications, and annual reports of organisations connected with education. Also includes 400 journals, with strengths in learning difficulties and special education, educational psychology, and education overseas.
Josephine Butler Collection	Small collection of materials received from the University of Liverpool on Butler and her work.

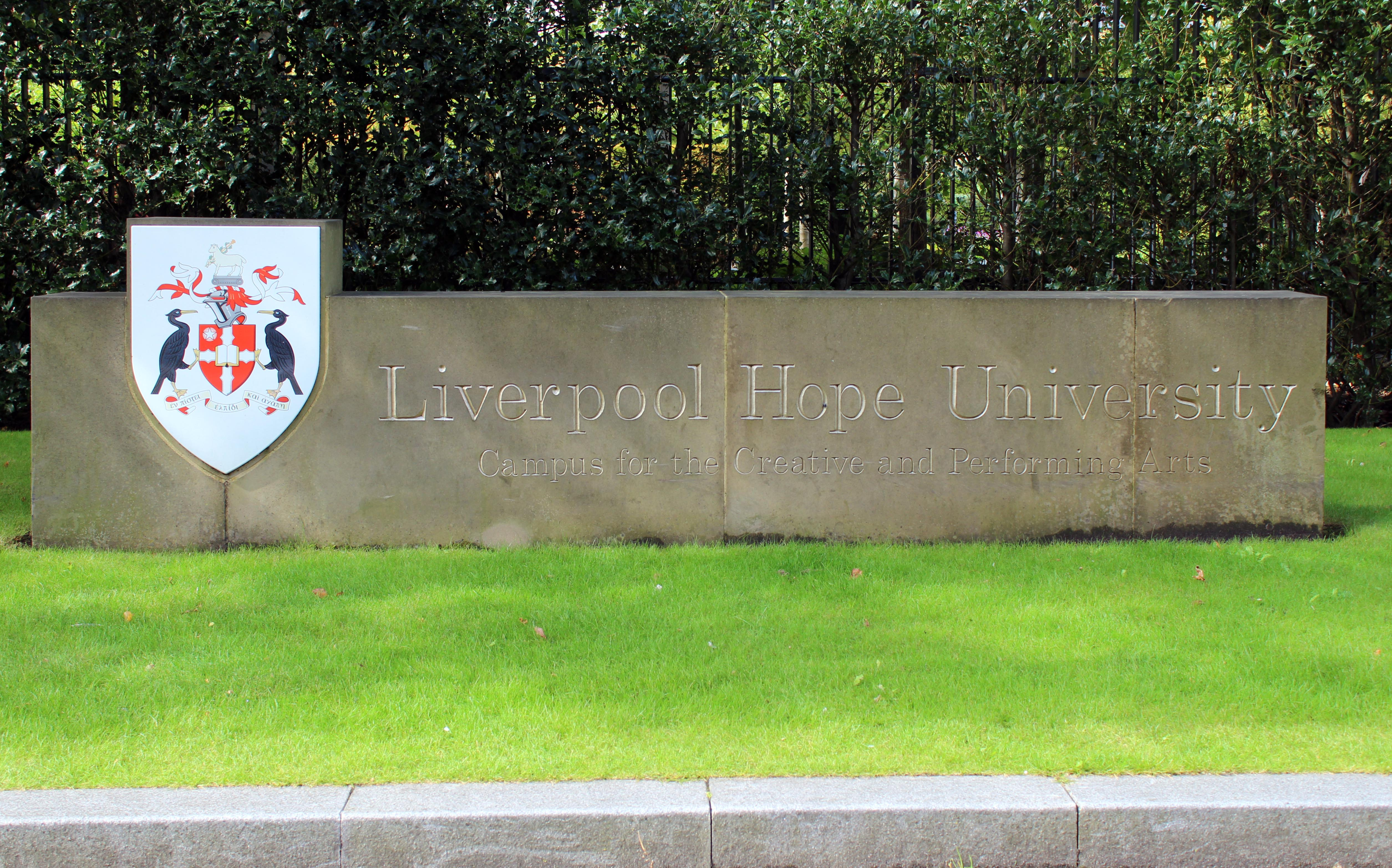
Entrance sign

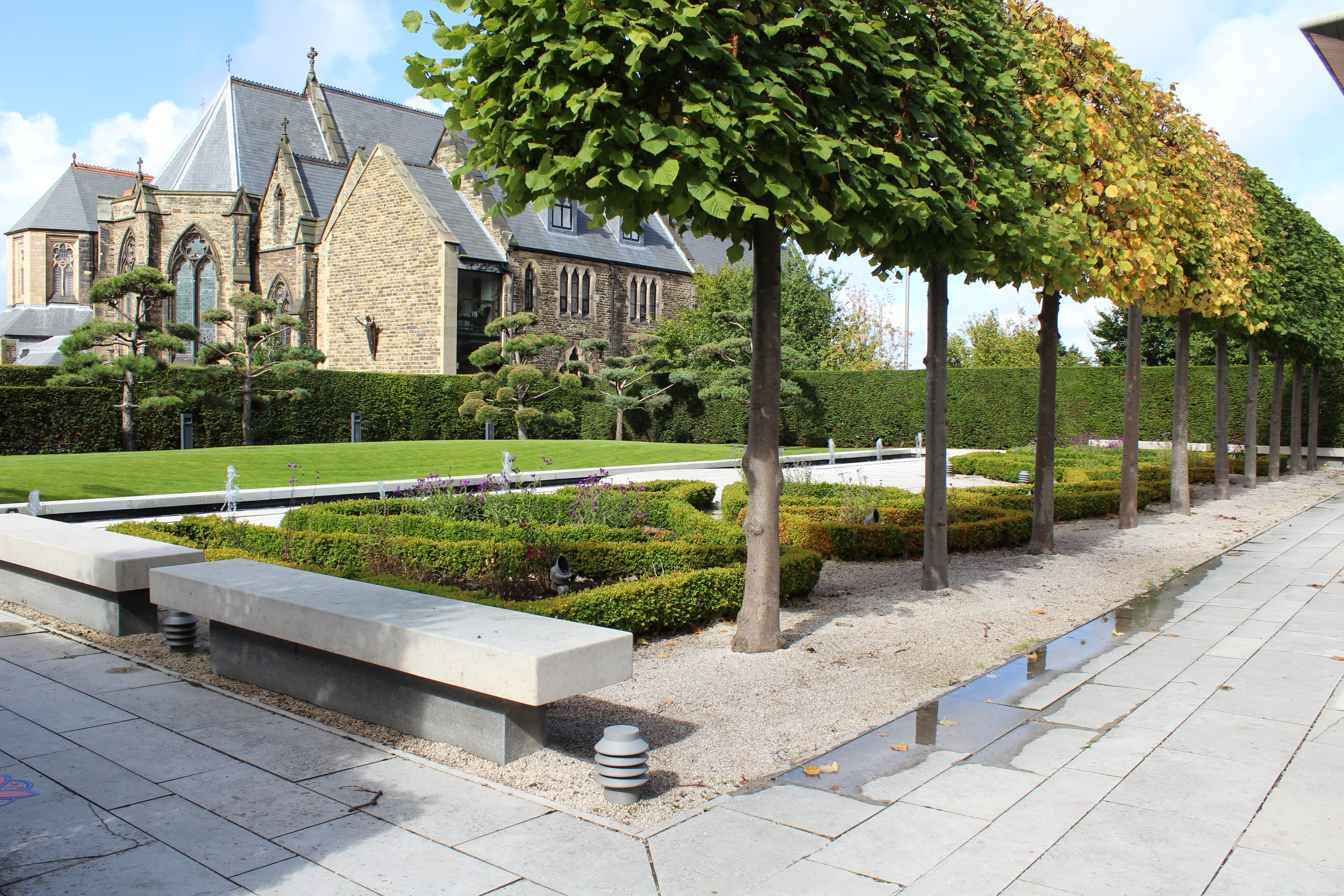
Garden against the backdrop of St Francis Xavier's Church

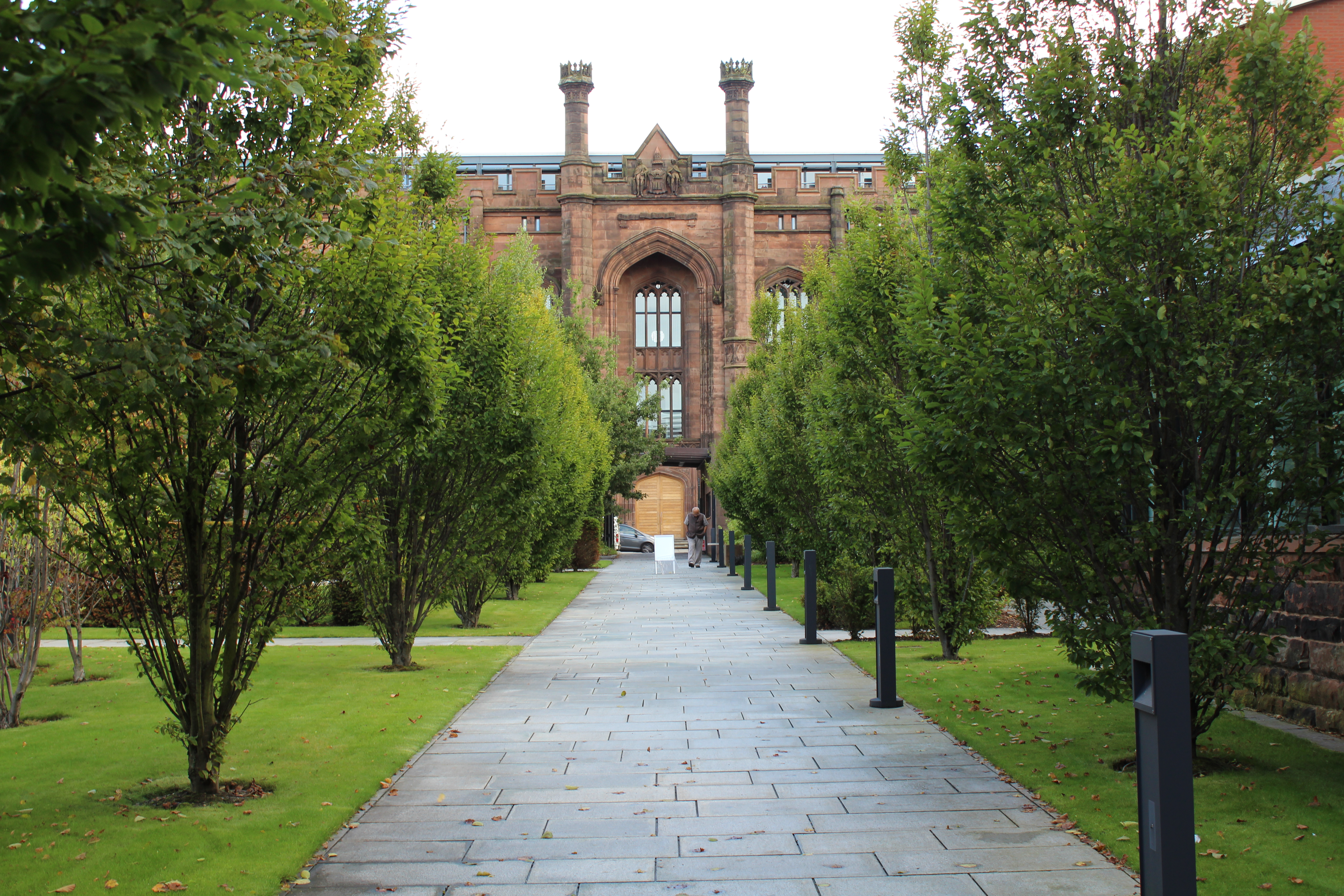
Looking towards the campus exit

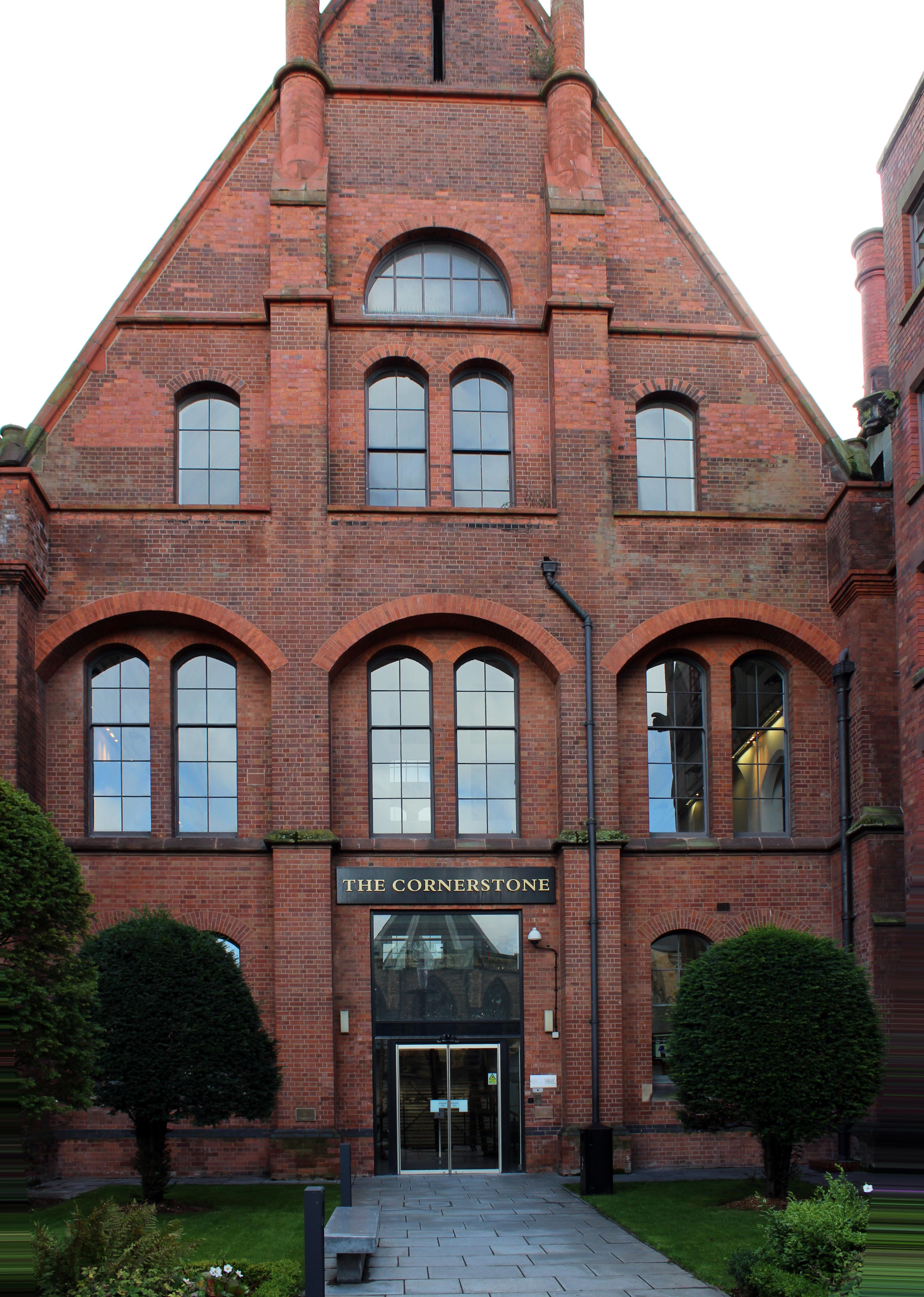
Entrance to the Cornerstone Building

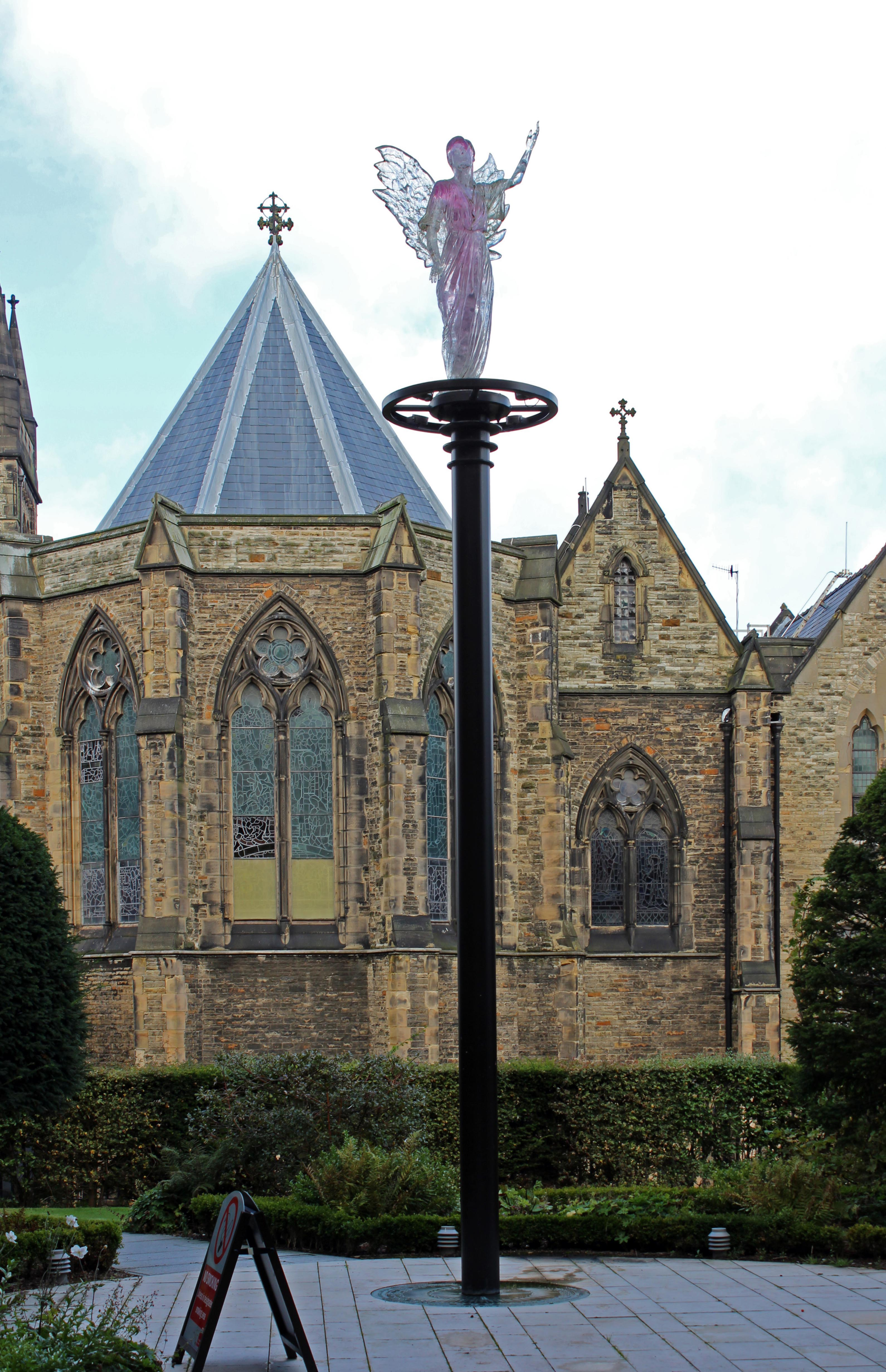
Statuette in front of the Cornerstone Building

The university's specialist campus for music and visual and performing arts teaching is the Creative Campus in Everton next to St Francis Xavier's Church. The university also has a residential-only campus, Aigburth Park in St Michael's, and Plas Caerdeon, an outdoor education centre in Snowdonia, North Wales.

The university's teaching campuses contain three Grade II listed buildings. One of these is the former main building of Saint Katharine's College at Hope Park, now renamed as the Hilda Constance Allen Building. The Creative Campus includes the other two: the former Saint Francis Xavier's School (now the Cornerstone Building) designed by Henry Clutton, and the former LSPCC (Liverpool Society for the Prevention of Cruelty to Children) building at 3 Islington Square.

Hope Park is bisected by Taggart Avenue, which runs north–south through the middle of the campus and divides the former sites of two of the university's three predecessor colleges. On the western side of Taggart Avenue is the former campus of Christ's College, while the eastern side (which besides Hilda Constance Allen also includes the EDEN Building and the Sheppard-Worlock Library) was formerly the campus of Saint Katharine's. In the era when the two colleges existed, high walls ran along both sides of Taggart Avenue, physically separating the institutions.

The university's third predecessor college, Notre Dame, was located on Mount Pleasant at its corner with Hope Street. Its former property, which it vacated in 1980, was acquired by Liverpool Polytechnic and became part of the campus of LJMU, the polytechnic's successor institution. Together with an adjoining townhouse it forms LJMU's John Foster Building.

== Organisation and administration ==
The university follows a Christian principle to avoid bank loans and has not taken out a new bank loan since the mid-2000s. Expenditure is financed from university cash reserves, and the university budget is set from zero each year with only permanent staffing rolled over. In 2018, the university established an Income Generation Plan to diversify income streams away from a reliance on undergraduate tuition fees.

=== Schools and departments ===
The university comprises four faculties and nine schools. The School of Creative and Performing Arts is located at the Creative Campus, with all other schools/departments at Hope Park.

- Faculty of Business, Law and Criminology
  - Liverpool Hope Business School
  - School of Law and Criminology
- Faculty of Creative Arts and Humanities
  - School of Creative and Performing Arts
  - School of Humanities
- Faculty of Education and Social Sciences
  - School of Education
  - School of Social Sciences
- Faculty of Human and Digital Sciences
  - School of Health and Sport Sciences
  - School of Computer Science and the Environment
  - School of Psychology

=== Branding ===
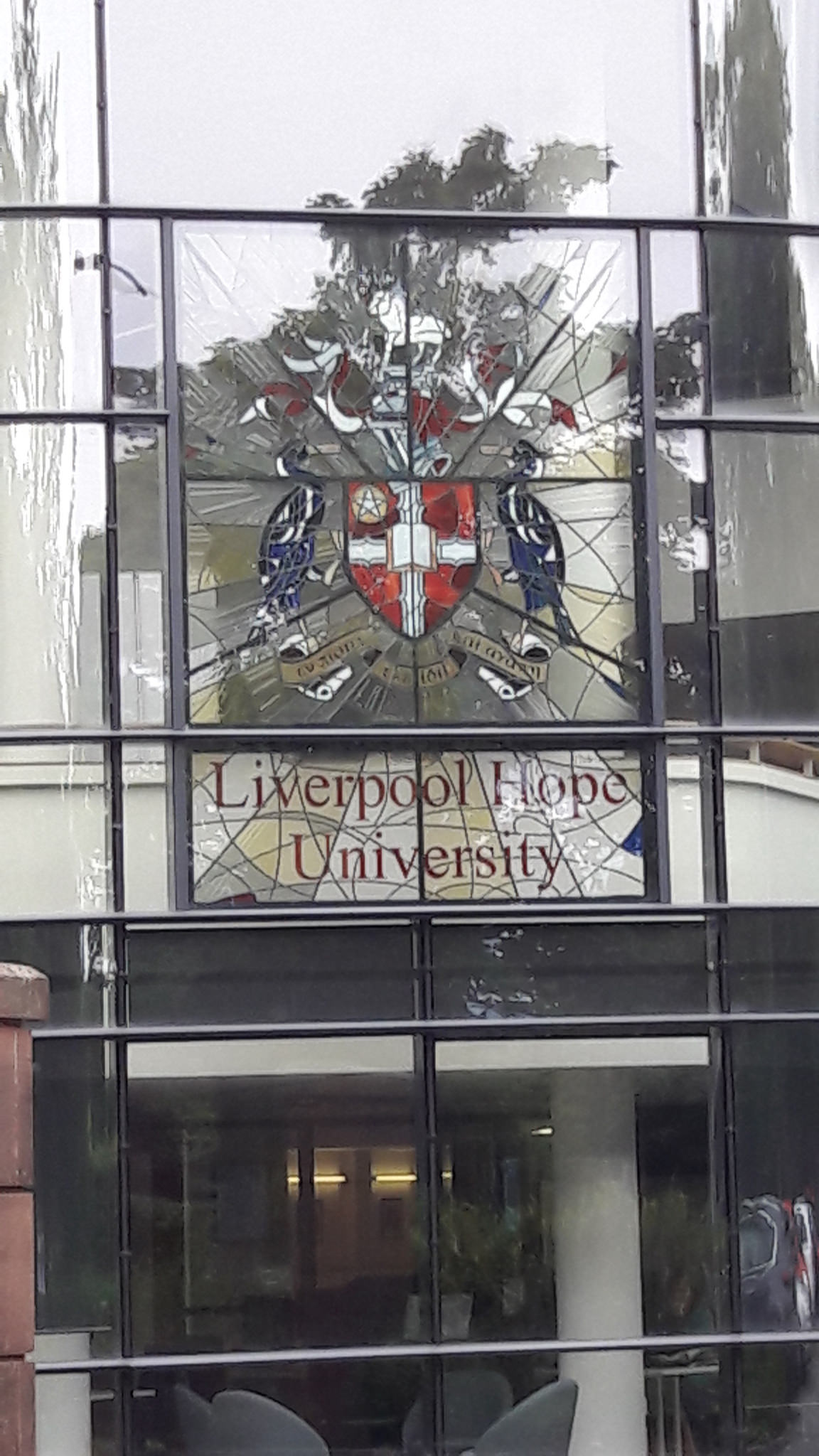
University coat of arms in a stained glass window at the southern end of the EDEN Building

Elford's The Foundation of Hope discusses how brand management was of particular importance to the university in the 1990s, with the inception of the "Hope brand" in 1995: "The Hope brand was vigorously developed and marketed"; "New corporate colours [were developed]". The university had previously struggled to unite its three predecessor colleges into a single corporate identity, with "internal dissonances" persisting. Elford argues that, during its time as Liverpool Institute of Higher Education, the university "had effectively failed to establish an identity of its own".

The university adopted red as the main corporate colour of the Hope brand, primarily contrasted with white. It is the only university in the Liverpool metropolitan area that uses red, a corporate colour more commonly associated with universities elsewhere in the historic "red rose" county of Lancashire (in particular Lancaster, Salford and UCLan). The university uses red for spiritual/theological rather than geographical/historical reasons. Its original (1995–2006) logo (the word "hope" written in red in lower case italics with the tail of the "e" turning upwards and encircling the word) can be found in The Foundation of Hope on the book's title page and rear cover.

In 2016/17, the university began using its coat of arms as its sole corporate logo, emphasising its brand heritage. This involved retiring its most recent modern logo, which had been designed in partnership with the London-based creative agency Fabrik in 2006. For the 175th anniversary, in 2019, the university presented its coat of arms alongside the legend "175 YEARS OF ACADEMIC EXCELLENCE".

== Academic profile ==
In 2024/25, the university had 305 academic staff. 230 of these (75.41%) were qualified to doctoral level, placing the university 16th highest in the UK on this measure. The university's aim is for 85% of its academic staff to have doctorates and the remainder to be Professional Tutors with industry experience in areas such as education, law and accountancy.

=== Partnerships ===
The university is a member of the Cathedrals Group. Within this mission group, the university validates and awards the degrees of PhD and MPhil for Birmingham Newman University and St Mary's University, Twickenham.

The university has a number of international partnerships with other academic institutions, many of whom are Christian universities. Major partners include Université catholique de Lille in France, Christ University and Stella Maris College, Chennai in India, two American liberal arts colleges Hope College and Ouachita Baptist University, and Sun Yat-sen University in China.

The university's Network of Hope was established in 1998 as a set of partnerships with Catholic sixth-form colleges in the North West. Current Network of Hope partners include Carmel College (St Helens), Holy Cross College in Bury and St John Rigby College, Wigan. Its business school is an AACSB member.

=== Everton F.C. ===
In 2016 the university signed a five-year partnership agreement with Everton F.C. The partnership included a monitoring and evaluation project on the club's Everton in the Community Free School (opened in 2011) and graduate scholarships to research the club's history.

=== Awards ===
Year	Award	Result
2019	The Academic Insights Magazine – International University of the Year	Won

=== Reputation and rankings ===
Rankings
National rankings
- Complete (2027): 90=
- Guardian (2027): 95
- Times / Sunday Times (2027): 84=

Global rankings
- THE (2026): 1501+

For many years the university did not take part in university league tables. Upon entering for the first time in 2015 (for the 2016 edition), the university increased its positions, notably in the Guardian league table (which excludes research metrics). In the 2018 table announced in May 2017, the university outperformed its more prestigious neighbour the University of Liverpool for the first time, a fact used by the student news site The Tab in a 2018 April Fool's Day hoax that the University of Liverpool would lose its Russell Group status.

=== Teaching Excellence Framework ===
In June 2017 the university was awarded Gold by the UK Government's Office for Students in its Teaching Excellence Framework. It was one of two universities in the Liverpool metropolitan area (the other being Edge Hill) to achieve this rating. The university (alongside Coventry and Nottingham Trent) was named by the Guardian as one of the "excellent modern universities" who had been "rewarded with gold ratings, while some Russell Group institutions had to suffer the indignity of being awarded bronze". In the 2023 TEF assessment, the university's award was revised to "silver".

=== Research ===
The university has 12 research projects/centres:

- Andrew F. Walls Centre for the Study of African and Asian Christianity
- Archbishop Desmond Tutu Centre for War and Peace Studies
- Association for Continental Philosophy of Religion
- Centre for Christian Education and Pastoral Theology
- Centre for Culture and Disability Studies (CCDS)
- Centre for Education and Policy Analysis (CEPA)
- Irish Studies Research Group
- Ministry Research Project
- Popular Culture Research Group
- Sand Dune and Shingle Network
- Sarcopenia Ageing Trial
- Socio-Economic and Applied Research for Change (SEARCH)

== Student life ==
=== Halls of residence ===
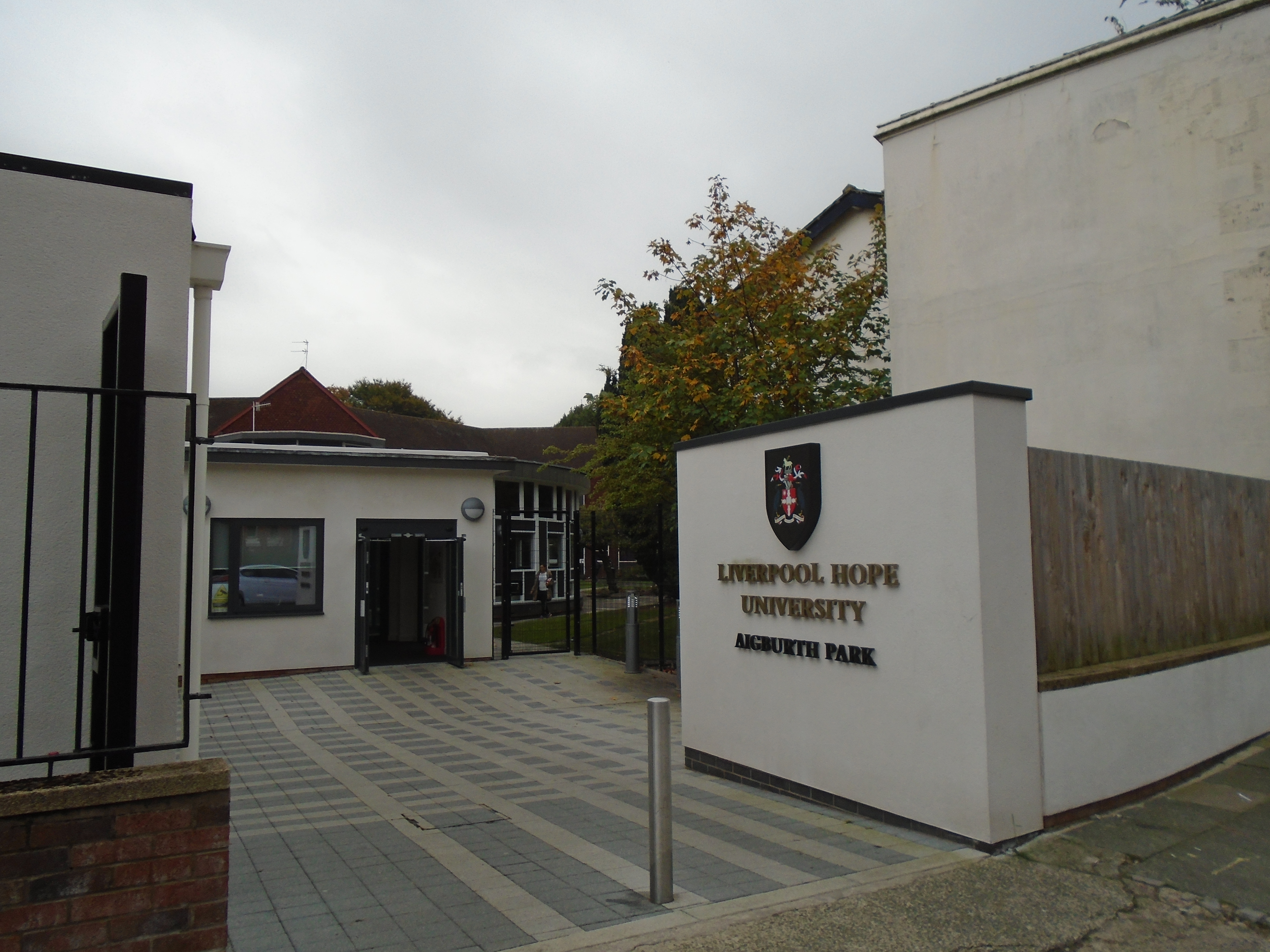
Entrance to Aigburth Park

There are 12 halls of residence for students enrolled at the university. (The university runs a free shuttle bus between the campuses.)

Name	Campus	Ensuite	Open to
Newman Hall	Hope Park	Yes	First year undergraduates
Teresa Hall	Hope Park	Yes	First year undergraduates
Wesley Hall	Hope Park	Yes	First year undergraduates
Oscar Romero Hall	Hope Park	No	First year undergraduates
Kitty Wilkinson Hall	Hope Park	No	First year undergraduates
Josephine Bhakita Hall	Hope Park	No	First year undergraduates
Catherine Booth Hall	Hope Park	No	First year undergraduates
Angela Hall	Hope Park	No	First year undergraduates
Austin Hall	Hope Park	No	First year undergraduates
Gerrard Manley Hopkins Hall	Creative Campus	Yes	All undergraduates
Josephine Butler Hall	Aigburth Park	Yes	All students
St Julie's Hall	Aigburth Park	No	All students

=== Students' Union ===
Students at the university are represented by the Students' Union (HopeSU), which is affiliated to the National Union of Students.

=== Student body ===
In 2024/25 the university had 4,985 students including 3,895 undergraduates and 1,090 postgraduates, making it the 126th largest university in the UK (out of the 169 universities included in HESA statistics). The university is less than half the size of the other two universities in the Liverpool metropolitan area with comparable histories, Edge Hill (13,560 students) and its elder sister Chester (13,545 students).

The university has a greater number and proportion of postgraduates than four of the six universities closest to it in size.

Name	Undergraduates	Postgraduates	Total
St Mary's University, Twickenham	3,670	1,855	5,520
University of Chichester	4,395	1,150	5,545
Harper Adams University	4,125	555	4,680
Queen Margaret University	3,510	1,615	5,130
Liverpool Hope University	3,895	1,090	4,985
University College Birmingham	4,435	495	4,930
St George's, University of London	3,520	810	4,330

== Notable people ==
=== Chancellors ===
- 2006–2013: Caroline Cox, Baroness Cox
- 2013–2020: Charles Guthrie, Baron Guthrie of Craigiebank
- 2020–: Monica Grady

=== Vice Chancellors and Rectors ===
- 1980–1995: James Burke
- 1995–2003: Simon Lee
- 2003–2022: Gerald Pillay
- 2023–2026: Claire Ozanne
- 2026 - Penny Haughan

=== Academics ===
- Frank Cottrell-Boyce, British screenwriter, novelist, and actor
- Salman Al-Azami, British-Bangladeshi author
- Richard Harries, Baron Harries of Pentregarth, Church of England bishop
- Helen King, British historian
- Atulya Nagar, mathematical physicist and author
- Deryn Rees-Jones, Anglo-Welsh poet
- Matt Simpson, English poet and critic
- Andrew Walls (1928–2021), British historian of missions

=== Arts ===
- Heather Craney, actress
- Simon Gilbert, journalist and author
- Amy Hughes, artist
- Terry Molloy, actor
- Malik Al Nasir, poet and author
- Stel Pavlou, screenwriter and novelist
- Willy Russell, playwright
- Mary Lu Zahalan, singer and actress

=== Politics ===
- David Alton, Baron Alton of Liverpool, former Liberal Democrat MP for Liverpool Mossley Hill and Liverpool Edge Hill
- Steve Brine, Conservative MP for Winchester
- Peter Kilfoyle, former Labour MP for Liverpool Walton
- Paul Nuttall, politician
- Mike Storey, Baron Storey, former Leader of Liverpool City Council
- Flo Clucas, former Deputy Leader of Liverpool City Council

=== Sport ===
- Diane Allahgreen, athlete
- Emma Hayes, United States women's national soccer team manager
- Colm McFadden, Gaelic footballer
- Jenny Meadows, athlete

== See also ==
- Armorial of UK universities
- College of Education
- List of universities in the UK
