= Alexander Gilkes =

British businessman (born 1979)

- Born: Alexander Mark Heming Gilkes; July 1979 (age 47); Camden, London, England
- Education: Eton College; University of Bristol
- Occupation: Businessman
- Spouse: Misha Nonoo (m. 2012; div. 2017)
- Partner: Maria Sharapova (2018‍–‍present) (Note: engaged in December 2020)
- Children: 1

Alexander Mark Heming Gilkes (born July 1979) is a British businessman. He is the co-founder of venture studio Squared Circles, which launched in 2020. He was previously the co-founder and president of online auction house Paddle8 from 2011 to 2018, when it was sold to The Native.

== Early life ==
Gilkes is the son of Jeremy Gilkes, a dermatologist, and was born and raised in London. He was educated at Eton College and at the University of Bristol.

== Career ==
Gilkes has been based in New York since 2008. He served as an auctioneer at Phillips de Pury & Company and worked at LVMH. Gilkes presided as an auctioneer for auctions including Madonna's Raising Malawi, Elton John AIDS Foundation, and amFAR.

In 2011, he founded Paddle8, an online auction website selling fine art, photography, street art and collectibles. In 2013, the company did $US20 million in sales. By 2015, the company reported "$US140 million" in sales. Paddle8 was sold in 2015 to The Native. Gilkes stepped down from his role at Paddle8 in 2018.

In 2020, Gilkes co-founded venture studio Squared Circles along with Lukas Derksen and Paddle8 co-founder Osman Khan.

Gilkes "has been named" as one of Fast Company's Most Creative Entrepreneurs in 2017, the 100 Most Powerful People in the Art World (Art + Auction) in 2014, 2015 and 2016, a Digital Maverick (DETAILS), one of the 40 Most Important People Under 40 (Apollo) and appeared on Vanity Fair and GQ's best-dressed lists. He serves on the board of the New York Academy of Art.

== Personal life ==
Gilkes married British-Bahraini fashion designer Misha Nonoo in Venice, Italy in May 2012 and the pair lived in New York City. Their divorce was finalized in the summer of 2017.

Since 2018, Gilkes has been in a relationship with Russian former tennis player Maria Sharapova. They announced their engagement on 17 December 2020. Their son was born on 1 July 2022.
