= Misha Nonoo =

Fashion designer

- Born: Bahrain
- Education: ACS Cobham; Guildford High School
- Occupation: Fashion designer
- Spouses: Alexander Gilkes (m. 2012; div. 2017) Mikey Hess (m. 2019)
- Children: 2
- Relatives: Houda Nonoo (cousin)

Misha Nonoo is a Bahraini and British fashion designer, best known for her eponymous line of women's ready-to-wear.

== Early life ==
Nonoo was born in Bahrain to a Jewish father of Iraqi descent and an English mother. Her family moved to London when she was 11, and she attended ACS Cobham School and Guildford High School in Surrey. During high school, Nonoo worked as a fashion model represented by Nevs Agency. She moved to New York City in 2009, and worked in menswear for a tailoring company.

== Career ==
In 2011, Nonoo launched her own fashion label. While working for a tailoring company in Manhattan, she designed and made women's jackets in her free time after work. Nonoo was spotted at Prune restaurant by a senior buyer from Intermix, a chain of designer fashion boutiques, wearing one of her own designs, and received a purchase order of $150,000 for her first collection.

She was a finalist in the 2013 Vogue/CFDA Fashion Fund. She was named to Forbes' 30 Under 30 in Art & Style list as well as Crain's New York Business’ 40 under 40 in 2015.

In 2015, Nonoo received media attention for producing an "insta-show" via Instagram. She was the first designer to produce a fashion show exclusively on Instagram for her spring collection during New York Fashion Week.

By September 2017, Nonoo had released seasonal collections and begun manufacturing all products on-demand, claiming this reducing waste and lowered costs for her customers.

In 2019, Nonoo collaborated with Meghan Markle on a clothing collection for the women's charity group Smart Works, along with retailers John Lewis, Jigsaw and Marks and Spencer.

== Personal life ==
Nonoo married Alexander Gilkes in Venice, Italy in May 2012 with Lana Del Rey performing at the wedding. Their divorce was finalized in the summer of 2017.

Her cousin, Houda Nonoo was the Kingdom of Bahrain's ambassador to the US.

She became engaged to Michael Hess, an heir to the Hess Oil fortune. They were married in a Jewish ceremony at Villa Aurelia, Rome on 20 September 2019, and held a reception at Cinecittà Film Studios. The wedding was attended by numerous royal and celebrity guests including Katy Perry, Orlando Bloom, Wendi Murdoch, Dasha Zhukova, Prince Harry and Ivanka Trump, daughter of the then President of the United States. Jason Derulo and former Beatles member Sir Paul McCartney, performed at the wedding. In spring 2020, the couple's first child, a son, was born. Their daughter was born in 2021.
