= Patrick van der Vorst =

Belgian/British art dealer and priest (born 1971)

The Reverend Father Patrick van der Vorst
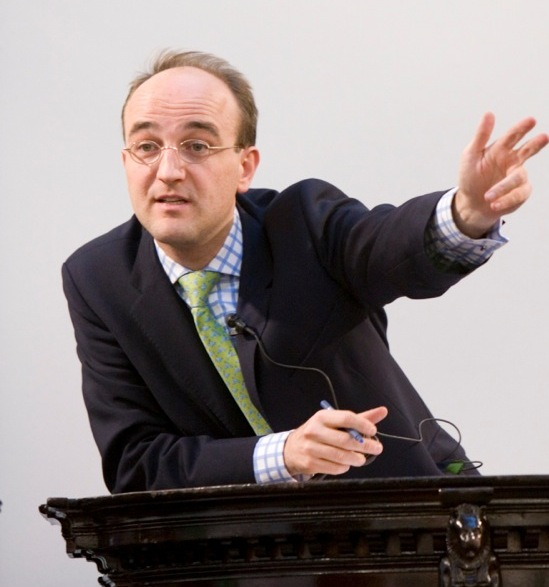
- Van der Vorst auctioneering
- Born: 2 May 1971 (age 55); Bruges, Belgium
- Occupations: Priest, art expert and auctioneer

Ecclesiastical career
- Church: Roman Catholic Church
- Ordained: 2022 (deacon); 2023 (priest)
- Congregations: Precentor at Westminster Cathedral; Our Lady of Mount Carmel and St George, Enfield

Patrick Van Der Vorst (born 2 May 1971) is a Belgian and British priest of the Roman Catholic Diocese of Westminster and former entrepreneur, dealer, art expert and winner on BBC's Dragons' Den.

== Early career ==
Van der Vorst is the grandson of Gaston Depré, CVP-politician and founder of the animal nutrition company Group Depre.

Van der Vorst attended the Katholieke Universiteit in Leuven, Belgium where he graduated in law. In 1995 he moved to London, where he has lived ever since. He started his career at Sotheby's Billingshurst in 1996 and transferred in 1997 to Bond Street in London, working first in the impressionist and contemporary art departments, before moving into the furniture department. At age 28 he became deputy director at Sotheby's and at 31 a director and head of continental furniture, specialising in 18th century French furniture. In these years he helped organise sales for Elton John's London home, the Easton Neston Sale, Thurn & Taxis, etc. At the age of 39 he left Sotheby's to set up his own company, ValueMyStuff.

== Professional Work and Priesthood ==
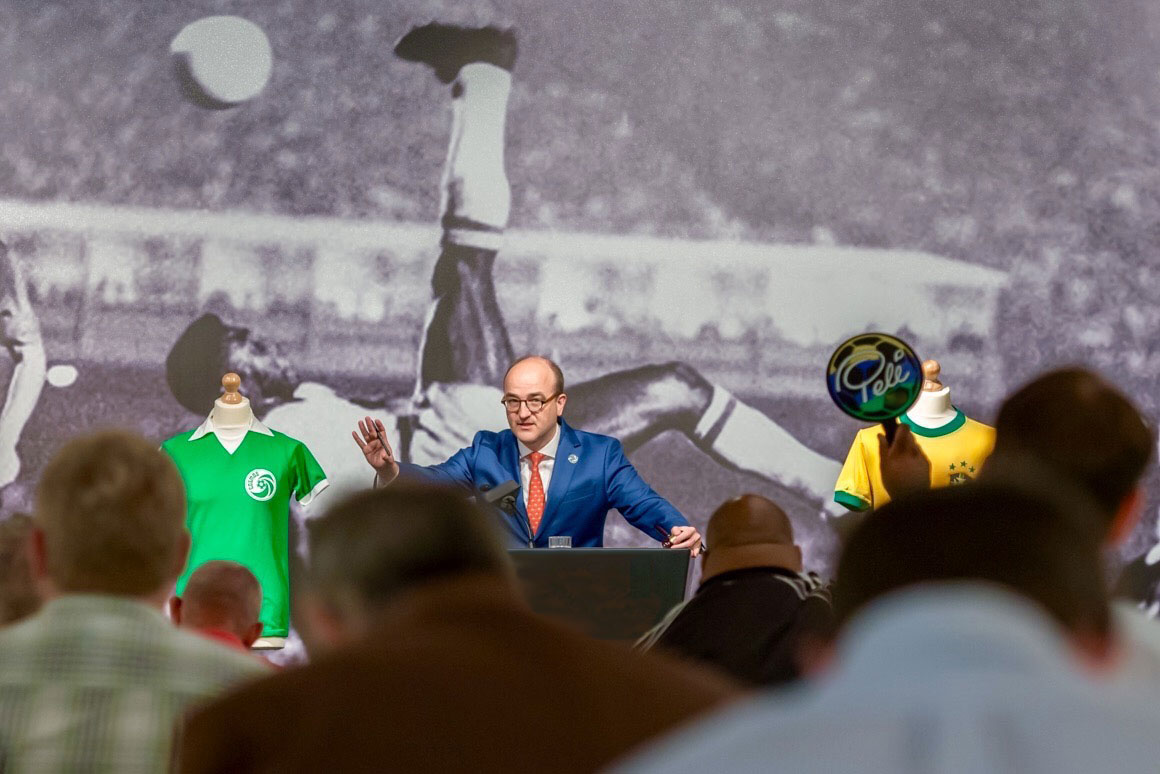
Auctioneering the Collection of Pele, footballer. 1958 World Cup medal sells for £200,000

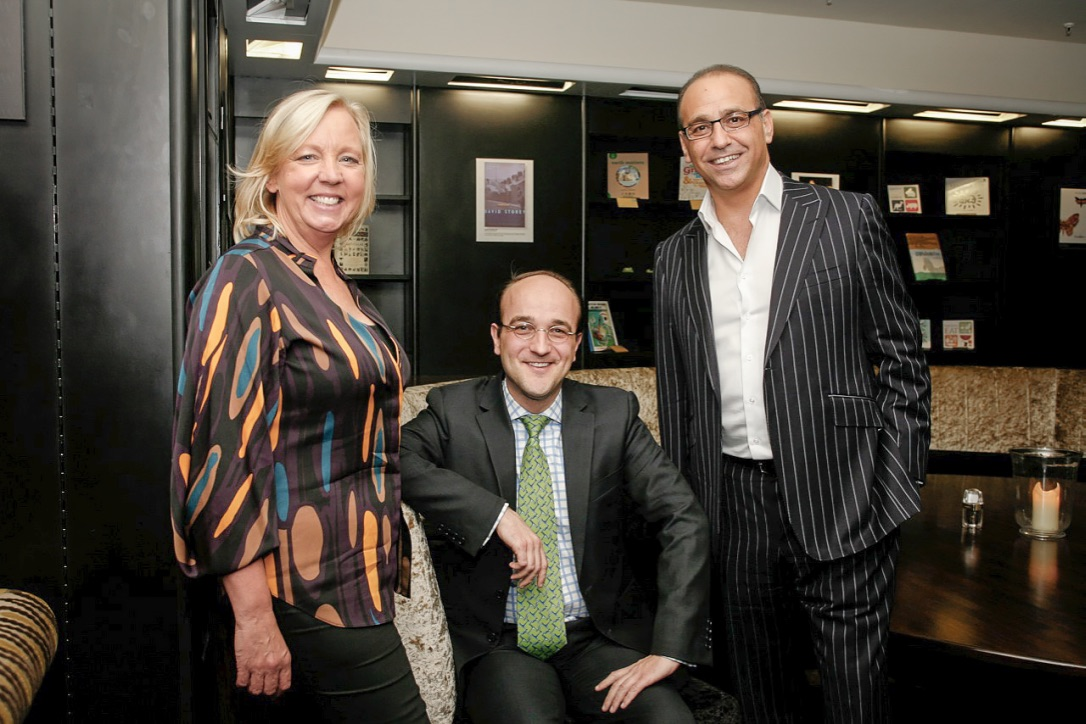
Deborah Meaden, Patrick van der Vorst, Theo Paphitis

=== Sotheby's ===
Van der Vorst worked at Sotheby's from 1995 to 2010 where he was a senior director of the company.

=== ValueMyStuff ===
Founded in 2009, ValueMyStuff is an online antique valuations service. In 2010, van der Vorst appeared on Dragons' Den and secured a £100,000 ($170,000) investment from Deborah Meaden and Theo Paphitis. It was bought in 2015 by Auctionata for an undisclosed sum to the new owners the De Rijck family . After Auctionata's 2017 insolvency, ValueMyStuff was sold as a going concern. Van der Vorst bought back the ValueMyStuff assets in January 2017. After additional ValueMyStuff product launches, Van der Vorst sold the company in October 2018 to the Swedish owned Barneby's group, a leading search engine for art and antiques.

=== St George Valuations ===
Alongside ValueMyStuff, Van der Vorst also founded St George Valuations in 2011 and is the premium brand of his online antiques business ValueMyStuff. St George Valuations conducts in-person valuation assignments, appraising and cataloguing the contents of country estates, museum collections and/or individual items, from silver spoons to contemporary art. Over 500 country estates and public collections have been valued.

=== Christian Art ===
Van der Vorst launched christian.art a website that sends out daily emails, listing the Gospel text for the day, alongside a work of art relevant to that reading. The mission is that "Art and Christianity no longer resonate as an inherent, magnificent pairing. Actually it is a feeling that goes both ways: most Christians no longer see Art as being important or even as a relevant way of promoting the faith; and non believers don't value Christianity as having been at the forefront of the arts throughout the centuries, responsible for creating some of the most magnificent artworks out there. The websites' offering is simple: one newsletter a day is sent out with the Gospel reading of the day, alongside a work of art that Patrick believes is poignant, reflective and appropriate to that reading. A short reflection accompanies the work of art.

=== Stukken van Mensen - Belgian TV ===
Van der Vorst has participated as a judge/dealer for five seasons (2016–2020) on the Belgian TV series Stukken van Mensen on Vier TV in Belgium, based on the British TV show Four Rooms.

=== Priest for the Diocese of Westminster ===
In September 2019, Van der Vorst started seminary for the Diocese of Westminster at the Pontifical Beda College in Rome, training for the Catholic priesthood. On 15 June 2022, he was ordained as a deacon by Mark Davies, Bishop of Shrewsbury, at Saint Paul's Basilica. On 24 June 2023, he was ordained a priest by Cardinal Vincent Nichols at Westminster Cathedral. He was then assigned as an assistant priest in the parish of Our Lady of Mount Carmel and St George, Enfield.

As member of the College of Chaplains at Westminster Cathedral, Van der Vorst currently serves as the Cathedral Precentor and Prefect of the Sacristy. He oversees the liturgy and coordinates special services, liaising with the Music Department, and manages the Cathedral diary. Additionally, he provides pastoral care of the Guild of St John Southworth and the Cathedral Stewards.

=== Writings and publications ===
- Van der Vorst is a contributor to the Huffington Post.
- Appearance on BBC's Dragons' Den
- Deborah Meaden website page on Patrick
- Het Laatste Nieuws article
- Interview CNBC TV
- Nieuws 365 article
- Video on ValueMyStuff
- Article De Morgen
- Management today Article
- Book launch Belgian radio - video
- Kerknet interview
- Gospel in Art: The Beheading of Saint John the Baptist
