= Kerknet =

Kerknet (launched 2007) is the web portal of the Catholic Church in Flanders, Belgium. It was initially run by a non-profit of the same name (Kerknet vzw), together with its associated YouTube Channel and Twitter profile. In May 2012 the site was subject to a series of DDOS attacks seeking to "silence the Church". On 18 February 2015 the site was relaunched as a web portal.

In May 2024 the Kerknet web portal became part of the newly established Catholic media group Otheo.
