= Thomas Hesse =

- Education: Oxford University and University of St. Gallen
- Occupation: Entrepreneur
- Years active: 2002-present

Thomas Hesse is a media and digital media executive and entrepreneur. He is the founder of Dreamstage Inc. and Consonance Investments LLC. He was previously the President of Global Digital Business & US Sales/ Distribution for Sony Music Entertainment and president of Corporate Development and New Businesses as well as Member of the Executive Board of Bertelsmann.

== Education ==
Hesse holds a BA and MA from Oxford University, an MSc from the London School of Economics and a Doctorate in Corporate Finance from the University of St. Gallen. He studied as a concert pianist at the Mozarteum in Salzburg and the Hochschule für Musik in Düsseldorf, Germany.

== Career ==
Hesse began his career in the media and entertainment industry as a corporate consultant at McKinsey & Company, In 2002, he was appointed as the EVP and chief strategic officer of BMG in New York. Prior to joining BMG, he held a number of executive positions at the company's television division RTL, including the secretary-general of RTL Television and CEO of RTL New Media. He briefly held a position as restructuring CEO of Paddle8 Auctionata, a startup formed from the merger of New York-based Paddle8 and Berlin-based Auctionata.

In his position as president and chief digital officer at Bertelsmann, Hesse oversaw the company's worldwide corporate and digital development, as well as its music rights division BMG Rights Management and its venture capital arms, Bertelsmann Digital Media Investments and Bertelsmann Asia Investments. He was also responsible for the M&A team and the company's engagement in education venture fund University Ventures.

Hesse has been the president of Sony Music and he was the in-charge of Global Digital Business and US Sales & Distribution. He also led Sony Music's digital direct-to-consumer efforts and was as co-founder of VEVO, the digital music channel, together with Universal Music and Abu Dhabi Media Company.

== Copy protection rootkit scandal ==
In 2005, asked about the Sony BMG Copy protection rootkit, Hesse's declaration to Neda Ulaby: "Most people, I think, don't even know what a rootkit is, so why should they care about it?" became famous and added prominence to the case to reporters and the general public.
